= List of public art in Wiltshire =

This is a list of public art in Wiltshire, in England. This list applies only to works of public art accessible in an outdoor public space. For example, this does not include artwork visible inside a museum.

== Alton Barnes ==
Image	Title / subject	Location and coordinates	Date	Artist / designer	Type	Material	Dimensions	Designation	Owner / administrator	Notes
	Alton Barnes White Horse	Alton Barnes, Alton, Wiltshire	1812	Robert Pile	Hill figure	Chalk				
	Alton Barnes White Horse sarsen stone	Alton Priors, Alton, Wiltshire			Carving on stone	Sarsen stone				

== Amesbury ==
Also including public art in nearby areas.

Image	Title / subject	Location and coordinates	Date	Artist / designer	Type	Material	Dimensions	Designation	Owner / administrator	Notes
	Airmen's Cross	Stonehenge Visiting Centre, Amesbury	1912		Memorial (wheel cross)	Stone		Grade II listed.		Originally located at Airman's Cross. Moved December 2013.
	Amesbury War Memorial	Church Street, Amesbury	1920		War memorial (cross)	Stone				Reammended in 2011.
	Bladehenge	Solstice Park, Amesbury	11 March 2013	Charlotte Moreton	Sculpture	Steel				Inspired by the nearby Stonehenge.
	The Dragonfly	Solstice Park, Amesbury	11 June 2007	Charlotte Moreton	Sculpture					Made with recycled helicopter parts.
	Memorial for Major Alexander William Hewetson	Fargo Wood, Amesbury	1913?		Memorial (wheel cross)	Stone				
	The Mallow	Solstice Park, Amesbury	17 June 2008	Charlotte Moreton	Sculpture	"Road sign materials"				The park's second sculpture.
	Millennium Cross	The Centre car park, Amesbury	2000		Cross wheel	Stone				Commemorating the third millennium.
	Monumental pillar	Salisbury Street, Amesbury	1981		Monumental pillar	Stone				
	Red Kite	Solstice Park, Amesbury	4 October 2011	Charlotte Moreton	Sculpture	Steel				
	River Avon (a.k.a. The Avon)	Solstice Park, Amesbury	10 September 2009	Charlotte Moreton	Sculpture	Steel				
	Rotary Club of Amesbury Wishing Wheel	The Co-operative Food, Salisbury Street, Amesbury	January 2007	Wooler Ltd	Monumental water wheel	Brick, metal				Commemorates the centenary of the club, 1905–2005.
	White Horse	Solstice Park, Amesbury	21 September 2010	Charlotte Moreton	Sculpture	Steel				Inspired by the county's white horse hill figures.

== Bradford on Avon ==
Image	Title / subject	Location and coordinates	Date	Artist / designer	Type	Material	Dimensions	Designation	Owner / administrator	Notes
	Bradford-on-Avon War Memorial	Bradford-on-Avon	1922		War memorial (obelisk)	Stone				Obelisk war memorial.
	Cat	Mr Salvat's Coffee Room, St. Margaret's Street, Bradford on Avon	17th century (the coffee room)		Sculpture	Stone		Grade II listed (44 St Margaret's Street)		
	Chi Rho symbol	Newtown, Bradford-on-Avon			Inscription					Directly above Lady's Well, sharing the same niche.
	Co-op mosaic	1 and 2 Shambles, Bradford-on-Avon	1930?		Mosaic					Advertising mosaic for the former Co-operative.
	The Iron Duke	Kingston Road, Bradford-on-Avon	24 September 2016		Memorial	Iron, glass			Bristol Museums, Galleries & Advice	Reassembled 19th century calender serving as a memorial to the local rubber industry.
	Magic Frog	Middle Rank, Bradford-on-Avon			Sculpture	Stone		Grade II listed (1-18, Middle Rank)		Visitors are encouraged to rub its head and make a wish.
More images	Millie	Festival Garden, Bradford-on-Avon	22 January 2000	Dr John Willats	Sculpture	Metal, stone				Millennium sculpture.
	Twinning Garden Mosaic	The Twinning Garden, Bradford-on-Avon	30 June 2006	Anita Andrews and Jane Mortimer	Mosaic	Stone, ceramic			Bradford on Avon Town Council	The plaque was installed in 2014.
	The Turf Maze	Barton Farm Country Park, Bradford on Avon	2000s		Turf maze	Turf				A turf maze.

== Calne ==
Image	Title / subject	Location and coordinates	Date	Artist / designer	Type	Material	Dimensions	Designation	Owner / administrator	Notes
	Calne War Memorial	Church St, Calne	1921	Reginald Blomfield	War memorial (cross)	Stone				
More images	Sheep	Sainsbury's, Calne	1997	Richard Cowdy	Sculpture	Bronze			Sainsbury's	Sculpted to draw attention to Calne's wool trade heritage.
More images	The Head	The Strand, Calne	2000	Rick Kirby	Sculpture					Millennium sculpture
More images	Two Pigs	Phelps Parade, Calne	1979	Richard Cowdy	Sculpture					The town's first public sculpture.
	Bas relief	River Wall, Calne		Richard Cowdy, Vivien ap Rhys Pryce	Sculpture					Commemorating the legend that Joseph Priestley discovered oxygen in Calne.

== Cherhill ==
Image	Title / subject	Location and coordinates	Date	Artist / designer	Type	Material	Dimensions	Designation	Owner / administrator	Notes
	Cherhill White Horse	Cherhill Down, Cherhill	1780	Dr Christopher Alsop	Hill figure	Chalk	160 feet tall, 120 feet wide			Hill figure
	Lansdowne Monument	Cherhill Down, Cherhill	1845	Henry Petty-Fitzmaurice, 3rd Marquess of Lansdowne	Obelisk	Stone	120 feet tall	Grade II* listed.		Commemorating the Marquess' ancestor Sir William Petty.
	Millennium sundial	Bus shelter, Cherhill	2001		Sundial	Stone, sarsen stone				Commemorates the third millennium, housed in an elaborate bus shelter.

== Chippenham ==
Image	Title / subject	Location and coordinates	Date	Artist / designer	Type	Material	Dimensions	Designation	Owner / administrator	Notes
	Chippenham Calf Sculpture	Borough Parade, Chippenham	14 September 2013	Richard Cowdy	Sculpture	Bronze	2 feet high, 4 feet long		Chippenham Civic Society	Commemorating the town's former historical cattle market.
	Chippenham Christian Fellowship I Am mural	Exterior wall of Revelation Christian Resource Centre, River Street, Chippenham	2000	Designed in part by Keith Wilson	Mural		14 feet high, 23 feet wide			Put up to celebrate the millennium.
	Chippenham War Memorial	Near Chippenham Museum & Heritage Centre, Chippenham	4 September 1921		War memorial and fountain	Sandstone ashlar, granite, slate		Grade II listed.		Constructed to include the location's unused fountain.
	Eddie Cochran Memorial Plaque	Rowden Post, Chippenham	12 October 2018	Adam Gittins	Illustrated monumental plaque					Replacing an original memorial plaque placed in 1990.
	Fountain	John Coles Park, Park Lane, Chippenham			Fountain	Stone				
	Town Arms	Yelde Hall, Chippenham	1776		Emblem			Yelde Hall is Grade I listed.		The "JS 1776" inscription refers to John Scott.
	The Twister	Monkton Park, Chippenham	21 September 1995	Lorraine Frost	Sculpture	Stone	1.8 metres tall			The drawings were by local children.
	William Henry Fox Talbot photographing a girl and her dog	Greenways Business Park, Chippenham	1993	Greta Berlin	sculpture	Bronze	7 feet tall			Commissioned by Timberlaine.

== Corsham ==
Image	Title / subject	Location and coordinates	Date	Artist / designer	Type	Material	Dimensions	Designation	Owner / administrator	Notes
	Corsham Court Gazebo	Corsham Court, Corsham	Early 18th century		Gazebo folly	Stone				
	Corsham War Memorial	Lacock Road, Corsham	Early 1920s		War memorial (cenotaph)	Stone				
	Mayo Memorial (a.k.a. Mayo Fountain)	71 High Street, Corsham	1896		Fountain, monument	Stone, ashlar	Grade II listed.		Memorial for Charles Mayo of Ivy House.	
	The Sham Ruin	Corsham Court, Corsham	1797	John Nash	Screen wall folly	Stone		Grade II* listed.		A wall giving the fake illusion that it is ruins.

== Cricklade ==
Image	Title / subject	Location and coordinates	Date	Artist / designer	Type	Material	Dimensions	Designation	Owner / administrator	Notes
	6th Airborne Division and 233 Squadron Memorial	RAF Blakehill Farm, Cricklade	1994		War memorial	Stone				
	Cricklade War Memorial	High Street, Cricklade	Early 1920s		War memorial (wheel cross)	Stone				
	Jubilee Clock	High Street, Cricklade	1897		Decoration monument	Iron		Grade II listed.		Commemorating the Golden Jubilee of Queen Victoria.
	RAF Blakehill Farm memorial	RAF Blakehill Farm, Cricklade	1994		War memorial	Stone				The memorial is on the right of the photo.

== Devizes ==
Image	Title / subject	Location and coordinates	Date	Artist / designer	Type	Material	Dimensions	Designation	Owner / administrator	Notes
	The Devizes Pyramid	Sidmouth Street	September 2008	Richard Cowdy	Sculpture	Metal, stone				Presented by Patrick and Joan Norton of Long Street, Devizes.
	Devizes War Memorial	Long Street	13 November 1922		Memorial	Stone		Grade II listed.		Unveiled by Lord Lieutenant of Wiltshire, Viscount Long.
	Devizes White Horse	Roundway Hill	29 September 1999	James Smith	Hill figure	Chalk, stone	148 feet tall, 150 feet wide			A third millennium-commemorating hill figure.
	The Fountain	Market Place	1879		Statue and fountain	Stone		Grade II listed as "The Fountain".		Erected to the memory of Sotheron-Estcourt.
	Millennium Cross	St Johns Churchyard 51.35042°N 1.99493°W	2000	Eric Stanford	Sculpture					Celebrates the Millennium and the 1000 year history of Devizes.
	Untitled	Shane's Castle, Bath Road			Trompe-l'œil	Painted stone				
	Wayside Monument	Monument Hill, Stert	1771		Monument and statue	Sandstone ashlar, granite, slate		Grade II listed.		A monument to James Long previously known as The Long Monument.

== Iford Manor ==
Image	Title / subject	Location and coordinates	Date	Artist / designer	Type	Material	Dimensions	Designation	Owner / administrator	Notes
	Britannia	Bridge over the River Frome, Iford Manor			Statue					

== Longleat ==
Image	Title / subject	Location and coordinates	Date	Artist / designer	Type	Material	Dimensions	Designation	Owner / administrator	Notes
	Fountain	The Orangery, Longleat	Early 19th century	Unknown	Fountain	Stone		Grade II listed.		A fountain in the gardens of The Orangery.
	Heaven's Gate	Heaven's Gate, Longleat	2001	Paul Norris	Sculpture	Stone, granite				A third millennium-commemorating set of sculptures.
	Janus Arch	Entrance to Longleat	3 December 2004	Angela Conner	Sculpture and fountain	Stainless steel	93 feet tall			A form of arch and fountain.
	Memorial to Joan Russell 1927–2003	Horningsham, Longleat	2003		Memorial and sculpture					Memorial to Joan Russell.
	St George & the Dragon	Adventure Castle, Longleat	2005	Elizabeth Rainsford	Sculpture					

== Ludgershall ==
Image	Title / subject	Location and coordinates	Date	Artist / designer	Type	Material	Dimensions	Designation	Owner / administrator	Notes
	Ludgershall Cross	High Street, Ludgershall	Medieval	Unknown	Preaching cross with carved figures	Stone				The surrounding ornamental iron fence was placed in 1897.
	Ludgershall War Memorial	High Street, Ludgershall	Early 1920s	Unknown	War memorial	Stone				

== Marlborough ==
Image	Title / subject	Location and coordinates	Date	Artist / designer	Type	Material	Dimensions	Designation	Owner / administrator	Notes
	Marlborough International Jazz Festival dedication stone	Priory Gardens, Marlborough	12 April 2022	Lisi Ashbridge	Carved, engraved stone monolith	Cumbrian slate				Commemorating the former Marlborough International Jazz Festival (1986–2016)
	Millennium Milepost	Midland and South Western Junction Railway trackbed, Marlborough		Andrew Rowe	Milepost sculpture	Cast iron				One of 1,000 Millennium Mileposts in the National Cycle Network.
	Shell Grotto	Marlborough Mound, Marlborough College, Marlborough 51.416573°N 1.737374°W	1720s	Members of the Seymour family	Grotto	Shells				
	Marlborough White Horse	Granham Hill, Marlborough	1804	Students of Mr Greasley's Academy	Hill figure	Chalk	62 feet long, 47 feet tall		Marlborough College	
	Untitled	Besides the River Kennet, Marlborough			Sculpture	Wood				Fashioned into a seat
	Untitled	Besides the River Kennet, Marlborough			Sculpture	Wood				Fashioned into a seat.

== Pewsey ==
Image	Title / subject	Location and coordinates	Date	Artist / designer	Type	Material	Dimensions	Designation	Owner / administrator	Notes
	King Alfred Monument	Market Place, Pewsey	June 1913		Statue	Stone		Grade II listed.		Commemorating the Coronation of George V.
	Pewsey White Horse	Pewsey Hill, Pewsey	April 1937	George Marples	Hill figure	Chalk	66 feet long, 45 feet tall		Pewsey 6X Club	Commemorating the Coronation of George VI.

== Royal Wootton Bassett ==
Image	Title / subject	Location and coordinates	Date	Artist / designer	Type	Material	Dimensions	Designation	Owner / administrator	Notes
	Forever	Royal Wootton Bassett	21 September 2015	Mark Humphrey	Sculpture, war memorial	Stone				
	Wootoon Bassett War Memorial	Royal Wootton Bassett	October 2004	Alan Wilson	War memorial	Metal, stone				A flagpole was placed beside it on 29 January 2010.

== Salisbury ==
Image	Title / subject	Location and coordinates	Date	Artist / designer	Type	Material	Dimensions	Designation	Owner / administrator	Notes
More images	Sidney Herbert, 1st Baron Herbert of Lea	Victoria Park, Salisbury	1863	Carlo Marochetti	Statue on pedestal	Bronze and stone				
	Angels : Harmony	Grounds of Salisbury Cathedral, Salisbury		Helaine Blumenfeld OBE	Sculpture	Marble				
	Cloaked Figure IX	Grounds of Salisbury Cathedral, Salisbury	1978	Lynn Chadwick	Sculpture	Bronze				
	Sir Henry Fawcett	Market Place, Salisbury		Henry Richard Hope-Pinker	Statue on pedestal	Bronze and stone			Salisbury City Council	
	Stone Curlew	Queen Elizabeth Gardens, Salisbury	October 2014	ATM	Mural				Salisbury City Council	Commissioned to mark the comeback of the Stone Curlew to Wiltshire
	Walking Madonna	Grounds of Salisbury Cathedral, Salisbury	October 1981	Elisabeth Frink	Sculpture	Bronze				

== Stourhead ==
Image	Title / subject	Location and coordinates	Date	Artist / designer	Type	Material	Dimensions	Designation	Owner / administrator	Notes
	Bristol High Cross	Stourhead Garden, Stourhead	1373 (original), 1663 (rebuilt)		Cross	Stone		Grade I listed.	National Trust	Originally placed in Bristol. Moved to Stourhead in 1780.
	The Obelisk	Great Oar Meadow, Stourhead Garden, Stourhead	1839	Henry Hoare II	Obelisk	Stone		Grade I listed.	National Trust	Originally erected in 1746. Rebuilt in 1839.
	The Pantheon	Stourhead Garden, Stourhead	1753–54		Folly temple	Stone		Grade I listed.	National Trust	A folly temple.
	St Peter's Pump	Six Wells Bottom Valley, Stourhead	1474		Pump, grotto, statues, columned-temple	Stone		Grade I listed.	National Trust	Placed here in 1786 by Henry Hoare.
	The Temple of Apollo	Stourhead Garden, Stourhead	1765	Henry Flitcroft	Folly temple	Stone		Grade I listed.	National Trust	A circular folly temple.
	The Temple of Floria	Stourhead Garden, Stourhead	1744–1746	Henry Hoare II	Folly temple	Stone		Grade I listed.	National Trust	The first Stourhead garden building.

== Swindon ==
Image	Title / subject	Location and coordinates	Date	Artist / designer	Type	Material	Dimensions	Designation	Owner / administrator	Notes
	Applause	Arts Centre, Devizes Road Swindon	2003	Mark Amis	Sculpture	Bronze	9 feet tall			
	Cow	Great Western Hospital, Swindon	1987 (original location) / September 2003 (current location)	Tom Gleeson	Sculpture	Wielded steel				Originally located outside the Princess Margaret Hospital.
	Film Star	Shaw Ridge Leisure Park, Swindon 51.56061°N 1.831753°W	1991	Robert Marshall	Statue					The statue depicts Diana Dors.
More images	Golden Lion	Bridge Street, Swindon 51.561685°N 1.785656°W	25 February 1978	Carleton Attwood, Gordon Allen and Edwin Horne	Sculpture	Cement / Glass Fibre				Moved from The Parade to Bridge Street in 2009.
	Gorilla	The Parade, Swindon	1985 (original location) / 12 May 1994 (current location)	Tom Gleeson	Sculpture	Wielded steel				
	Great Blondinis	Gorse Hill, Swindon	1987	John Clinch	Sculpture	Aluminium	17 feet tall			
	Hey Diddle Diddle	The Prinnels, Swindon	1992		Sculpture					
	Home Guard Memorial	River Ray, Purton Stoke, Swindon			Statue	Stone				
	Isambard Kingdom Brunel	Brunel Shopping Centre, Swindon	1973		Statue					Copy of Baron Marochetti's 1864 statue of Brunel in London.
	Liddington Parish Council 2000	Liddington Castle, Liddington, Borough of Swindon	2000	Liddington Parish Council with help from Ridgeway School	Sculpture	Stone, metal			Liddington Parish Council	"Viewing table" marking the third millennium.
	Looking to the Future	The Prinnels, Swindon	1985		Sculpture					
	Old Wiltshire Horn	Dewell Mews, Swindon	1989	Jon Buck	Sculpture					Marks the site of a former livestock market.
	Swindon: An Interesting Mural	Near the Golden Lion Bridge, Swindon	1976; repainted 2009	Ken White	Mural	Painted brick				Also known as the "Golden Lion Mural".
	White Horse Pacified	Shaw, Swindon	1987	Julie Livsey	Sculpture	Steel and concrete				Inspired by the white horse hill figures in Wiltshire.
	Wish Hounds	Croft County Park, Swindon	30 April 1993	Lou Hamilton	Sculpture	Powder coated scrap metal, concrete, earthworks				
	Spitfire	Spitfire Way, Swindon			Sculpture					There was once a real spitfire at this location.
More images	Stacked Fountain	Junction of Canal Walk, The Parade, Bridge Street, and Regent Street, Swindon 51.561536°N 1.785439°W	May 2010	Walter Jack	Sculpture	Stainless steel	2.8 meters tall and 2.58 meters wide			
More images	Gateway Beacon 1	Edgware Road, Swindon	June 2011	Peter Freeman and Nicholas Pearson Associates	Sculpture					
More images	Gateway Beacon 2	College Street, Swindon 51.561375°N 1.784675°W	June 2011	Peter Freeman and Nicholas Pearson Associates	Sculpture		6 metres high			

== Trowbridge ==
Image	Title / subject	Location and coordinates	Date	Artist / designer	Type	Material	Dimensions	Designation	Owner / administrator	Notes
	Coat of Arms	Sensory Garden, Trowbridge	1926		Tablet, emblem	Metal, stone				
	Crucifix	4 Hill Street			Shrine	Stone		Grade II listed.		Crucifix in a niche, a later addition to a c. 1814 building.
	Metal Work Sculpture	Sensory Garden, Trowbridge	August 2003	Local youths	Sculpture	Metal				Designed for the Trowbridge Area Festival of Fun.
	Pumpkin Tower	Bythesea Road, Trowbridge	2000	Thomas Rothschild	Folly				Thomas Rothschild	A folly tower.
	Shears Map	Trowbridge Park, Trowbridge	May 2000	Patrick Hallissey, Mervyn Grist, Michael Tollitt and Ian Marlowe	Sculpture	Metal, plastic, terracotta				Millennium sculpture originally located on Fore Street, but moved outside the Civic Centre in 2012.
	Gothic structure around Studley Pump	Frome Road, Upper Studley, Trowbridge	1862		Monument	Stone		Grade II listed alongside Studley Pump.		An elaborate structure sheltering Studley Pump.
	Trompe L'eoil	Roundstone Street, Trowbridge	October 2003	Roger Smith, Wiltshire Steeplejacks	Trompe-l'œil	Painted brick				Commemorates the 25th anniversary of Trowbridge Civic Society. New additions made in 2022.
	Trowbridge War Memorial	Trowbridge Park, Trowbridge	August 1921	J W Singer	War memorial with statue	Bronze, Portland stone		Grade II listed.		
	A Victorian Sensory Garden	Sensory Garden, Wiltshire	2004	David Bath	Sculpture	Wood, metal				Described as a "braille sculpture"
	World War I War Memorial	Holy Trinity Church, Trowbridge	1919–1920		War memorial (cross)	Stone		Grade II listed.		

== Warminster ==
Image	Title / subject	Location and coordinates	Date	Artist / designer	Type	Material	Dimensions	Designation	Owner / administrator	Notes
	Beyond Harvest	The Cornmarket Shopping Centre, Warminster	1990	Colin Lambert	Sculpture	Bronze			Civic Trust & Town Council	Commemorating the former corn market in this location.
	The Obelisk	Junction of Silver Street, Church Street and Vicarage Street, Warminster	1783		Obelisk			Grade II* listed.		Believed to stand on a medieval market cross.
	Smallbrook Nature reserve cabin mural	Smallbrook Nature reserve car park	2025	Tanya Hinton and Nick Andrew	Mural					Funded by community fundraising.
	Warminster Bird Trail	Various, mainly unused commercial buildings	2021	Tanya Hinton	Street art					More than 100 birds painted throughout the town during the Covid lockdowns.
	'Warminster Thing' Mural	Car park near Warminster information centre	2015, Repainted August 2025	Paul Boswell	Mural		20 Metres long			Painted in 2015 for the 50th anniversary of the 'warminster thing' sightings and featuring glow in the dark paint, mural was repainted in 2025 to mark the 60th anniversary.
	Warminster War Memorial	Junction of Portway and The Close, Warminster	29 May 1921		War memorial (cross)	Bath stone				Located in a small garden.

== Westbury and Bratton ==
Image	Title / subject	Location and coordinates	Date	Artist / designer	Type	Material	Dimensions	Designation	Owner / administrator	Notes
	Mosaic	Coopers Store, Edward Street, Westbury		Pupils of Matravers School	Mosaic	Glass				Commemorating the links between the youth of Westbury and the Chernobyl area.
	Illustrated toposcope	Westbury Hill, Bratton Downs, Westbury	1968	Pupils of Adcroft School of Building	Illustrated topscope	Metal, stone				An illustrated toposcope.
	Battle of Enthandun Memorial	Westbury Hill, Bratton Downs, Westbury	5 November 2000		Monument	Sarsen stone, metal				Denoting the location of the Battle of Ethandun.
	Bratton Memorial Cross	Village green, Bratton, Wiltshire	Early 1920s		War memorial (wheel cross)	Stone				
	Golden Jubilee of Elizabeth II Jubilee Beacon	Westbury Hill, Bratton Downs, Westbury	3 June 2002		Beacon	Metal				Commemorating the aforementioned jubilee.
	R & J Reeves & & Son memorial	B3098, Bratton, Wiltshire	1993		Monument	Brick, iron				Commemorating the village's former iron works, unveiled by Kathleen Reeves.
	Westbury War Memorial	Edward Street, Westbury			War memorial					Renovated in 2014. Flagpoles placed in 2011.
	Westbury White Horse	Westbury Hill, Bratton Downs, Westbury	1778		Hill figure	Concrete	180 feet tall, 170 feet wide		English Heritage	A well known hill figure.
	Yew Stump	Edward Street, Westbury	11 August 1990		Monument	Wood				A tree stump which was subsequently converted into a monument for the former 430-year-old tree.

== See also ==
- List of hill figures in Wiltshire
