= 3rd Stone =

Defunct British magazine

3rd Stone is a defunct British magazine devoted to "archaeology, folklore and myth" and dealing with Earth mysteries.

== History and profile ==
The magazine was originally published under the title of Gloucestershire Earth Mysteries (G.E.M.) magazine, founded by Danny Sullivan in the mid-1980s, and the name was changed to 3rd Stone magazine in 1986. The magazine was based in Cheltenham. Neil Mortimer took over as editor in 1995, and edited the magazine until its closure in 2003.

3rd Stone absorbed At the Edge magazine in 1998 before itself ceasing publication in 2003. Aubrey Burl, Ed Krupp, John Michell, Paul Devereux, Jeremy Harte, Rodney Castleden and Stan Beckensall are among the authors who contributed to the magazine.

Timothy Darvill, in reviewing The Modern Antiquarian, mentioned that The 3rd Stone followed "much the same path [as that book], and [had] a rapidly increasing subscription base and considerable public following" and that it carried "articles by a wide range of authors and gives each equal weight."

3rd Stone ceased publication with issue 47 published in 2003.

== See also ==
- List of magazines of anomalous phenomena
