= Edington, Wiltshire =

Village in England

Coordinates: 51.277°N 02.106°W

Edington
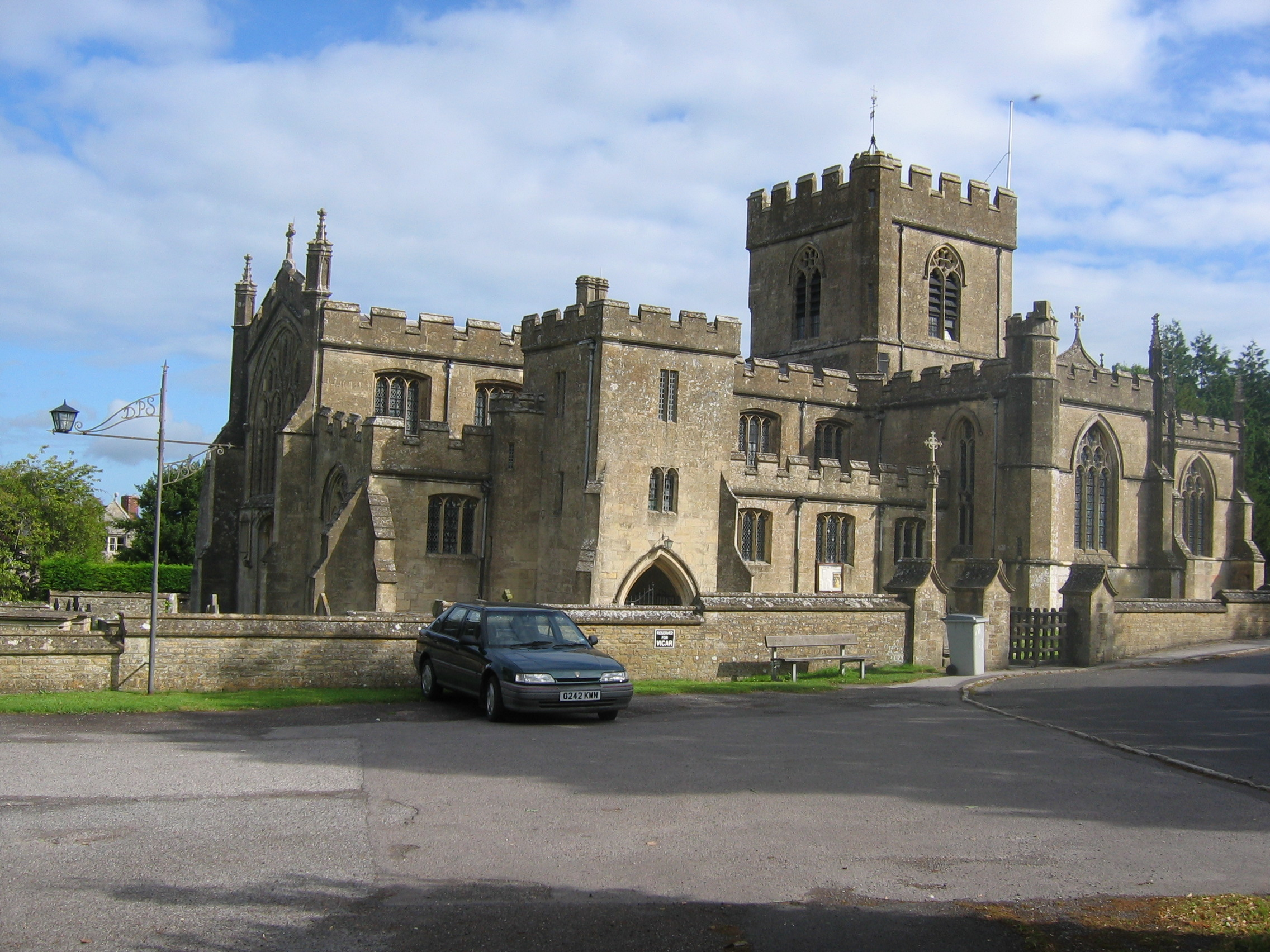
- Priory church (St Mary, St Katherine and All Saints)

- Location within Wiltshire
- Population: 703 (in 2021)
- OS grid reference: ST927531
- Unitary authority: Wiltshire
- Ceremonial county: Wiltshire
- Region: South West
- Country: England
- Sovereign state: United Kingdom
- Post town: WESTBURY
- Postcode district: BA13
- Dialling code: 01380
- Police: Wiltshire
- Fire: Dorset and Wiltshire
- Ambulance: South Western
- UK Parliament: South West Wiltshire
- Website: Village

Edington is a village and civil parish in Wiltshire, England, about 4 miles (6 km) east-northeast of Westbury. The village lies under the north slope of Salisbury Plain and the parish extends south onto the Plain. Its Grade I listed parish church was built for Edington Priory in the 14th century.

Tinhead is the former name of the eastern half of present-day Edington, towards Coulston along the B3098 Westbury to Market Lavington road. Tinhead is labelled on the Ordnance Survey map of 1945 but not on the 1958 map. Today the combined settlement is Edington and the name survives only in Tinhead Hill and Tinhead Lane.

== Geography ==
Tinhead Hill, in the south of the parish at grid reference ST941524, rises to 225 metres (739 ft). The southernmost part of the parish is within the Salisbury Plain military training area. A stream that rises at Luccombe Bottom and flows north-east divides the parish from Bratton, then flows north-west across the parish.

Bratton Downs, a biological and geological Site of Special Scientific Interest, includes the hillside above the village.

Three miles away is the Westbury White Horse, a chalk figure on the side of Westbury Hill first recorded in the 18th century, which is visible from Westbury and much of western Wiltshire although not from Edington.

== History ==
Evidence of prehistoric activity includes a long barrow at Tinhead Hill.

The ancient parish had three tithings: Edington, Tinhead, and Baynton and Coulston. The parish was part of the hundred of Whorwellsdown and is believed to hold a place in English history, for it was probably here that King Alfred the Great won a decisive battle in 878 against the Danes at the Battle of Edington (formerly known as the Battle of Ethandun).

In the year 957 the Witenagemot, or King's Council, met at Edington. The Domesday Book of 1086 records a large settlement of 67 households, held by Romsey Abbey and later known as Edington Romsey. After the establishment of Edington Priory in the mid-14th century, its manor later known as Edington Rector was created piecemeal through small purchases and gifts; the priory was also granted a manor at Tinhead.

Thomas Seymour, brother of Jane Seymour and thus uncle of the future Edward VI, acquired Romsey's lands in 1539. Edington Priory was surrendered in the same year, and in 1541 its property at Edington and Tinhead was also granted to Seymour. After his execution in 1549 the former assets of both monastic houses were granted to William Paulet, 1st Earl of Wiltshire (later Marquess of Winchester). The manors remained in the Paulet family until they were sold in 1768. In 1784 they were conveyed to Joshua Smith of Erlestoke Park, and they continued in the same ownership as Erlestoke, beginning with George Watson-Taylor MP after Smith's death in 1819. The estate was broken up and sold over several years after the death of Simon Watson-Taylor in 1902.

Another manor, which became known as Baynton, originated in the 13th century as part of Romsey Abbey's holdings. The Victoria County History traces its many owners, culminating in 1842 with the Watson-Taylors. After the manor house – near the present Upper Baynton Farm – was destroyed by fire in 1796, William Long bought a house at Coulston and renamed it Baynton House.

The Stert & Westbury Railway was built across the parish by the Great Western Railway Company, opening in 1900. A station named Edington and Bratton was half a mile (800 metres) north of Edington. The track continues in use as part of the Reading to Taunton Line but the station closed to passengers in 1952 and to goods in 1963; the station yard is a small industrial estate.

== Religious sites ==
Edington Priory was founded in the 14th century and became a monastery of the Brothers of Penitence, or Bonshommes. Its large church, which was restored in 1888–1891 by C. E. Ponting, continues in use as the parish church of St Mary, St Katherine and All Saints. It is a Grade I listed building. Since 1956, the church has been the venue for the Edington Music Festival of religious music, held every August; a registered charity, the Edington Music Festival Association, was established in 2002.

Apart from the church, other monastery buildings were destroyed by 1579; part of a fishpond survives.

A Methodist chapel was built in 1828 and a schoolroom added in 1876; it closed in 2006.

== Notable buildings ==
The Grade I listed house called The Priory, immediately north of the church, may incorporate parts of the monastic buildings. The property passed to the Paulets, Marquesses of Winchester after the Dissolution. Their tenants included Henry Baynton (from 1573) and Lady Anne Beauchamp (1630 to 1664); an inventory at the death of the latter listed more than 40 rooms. One range of that house remains, the rest having been demolished by a new owner, Joshua Smith of Erlestoke, in 1768. Two square projections with battlements are additions of c.1600 for the 4th Marquess. Around 1930, the porch was added and the interior was altered.

Also Grade I listed is a small 14th-century building set into the hillside over the Ladywell spring, about 400 metres south-west of the church. A conduit carried water to the monastery.

On Inmead, west of the church, are Whites Farm, a thatched late 16th-century timber-framed house; and The Grange, an 18th-century brick house with stone dressings, reputedly at one time occupied by Lavinia Fenton (1708–1760), a well-known London actress who was the mistress and then wife of Charles Powlett (or Paulet), 3rd Duke of Bolton.

The former George Inn on Tinhead Road was a coaching inn from the early 18th century, serving Salisbury–Bath coaches which ran through the village. On the other side of the road, Shore House is a much-altered timber-framed building from the late 16th century. Further down Tinhead Road, Beckett's House has two parallel ranges: the front one incorporates a timber-framed house of c.1600 and the rear range is 17th-century.

== Local government ==
The civil parish elects a parish council. It is in the area of Wiltshire Council unitary authority, which performs all significant local government functions.

The population of the parish was 834 at the census of 1801 and 1,136 in 1841. It had fallen back to 714 in 1931 and in 1951 it was down to 579, partly due to the civil parish having been reduced in area in 1934, when an eastern strip including the hamlet of West Coulston was transferred to Coulston.

== Notable people ==
William Edington (d. 1366), from an Edington family, became Treasurer of England and bishop of Winchester, and founded and endowed the monastery at Edington.

William Gullick, the man who designed the New South Wales Coat of Arms, was baptised here in 1858.

== Amenities ==
The village is some six miles from the county town of Trowbridge, which, with Devizes and Westbury, provides shopping facilities. Edington has a village common and a public house, the Three Daggers. The parish church is the home of the nationally known annual Edington Music Festival.

Many children from Edington go to the primary school in the slightly larger neighbouring village of Bratton. Secondary school options include Trowbridge, Lavington, and Matravers School at Westbury. The parish had a National School, built at Tinhead in 1877; it closed in 1956 owing to falling pupil numbers.

== Gallery ==
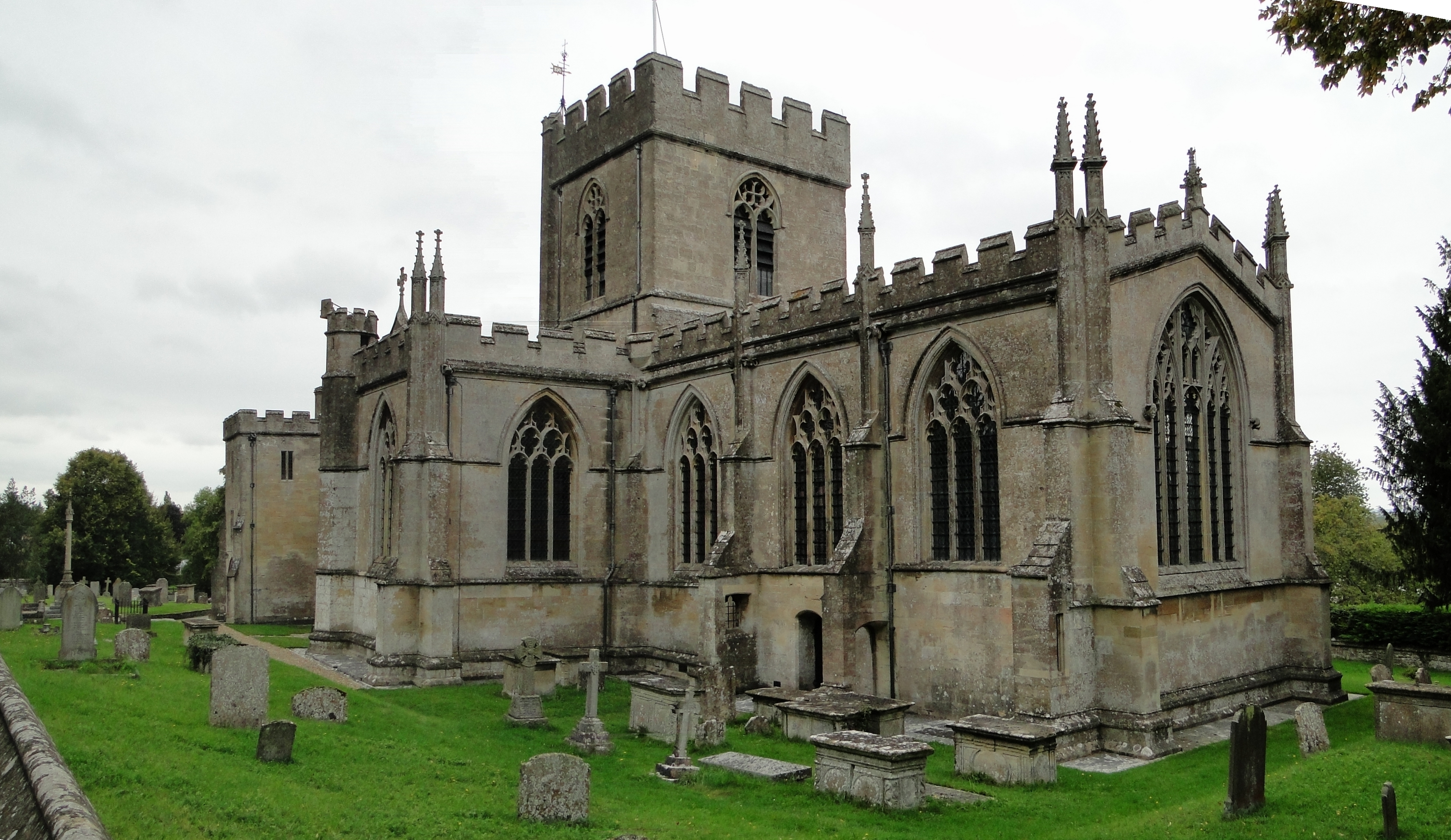
St Mary, St Katherine and All Saints Church

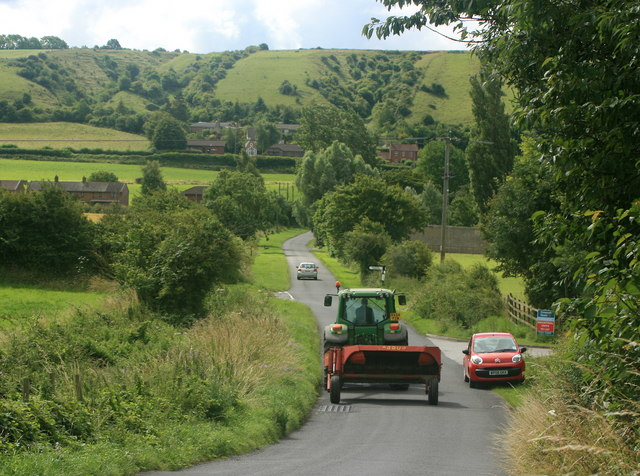
Example of Edington's rural setting

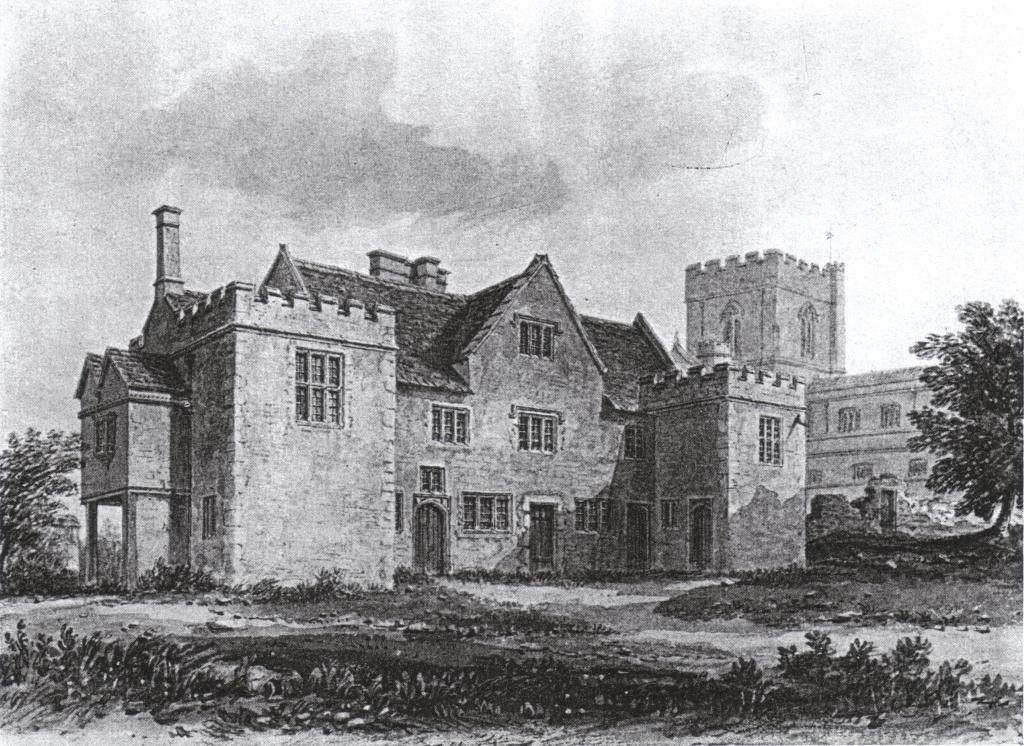
The Priory

== Sources ==
- Janet H. Stevenson, ed. (1987). The Edington cartulary. Wiltshire Record Society. Vol. 42. Devizes: Wiltshire Record Society. OCLC 20726378.
