= Bratton Downs =

Site of Special Scientific Interest in Wiltshire, England

Coordinates: 51.2689°N 2.1089°W

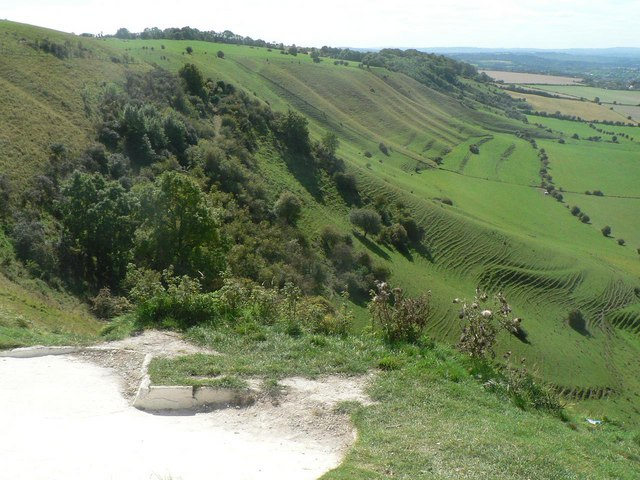
Westbury Hill, seen from the Westbury White Horse

Bratton Downs (grid reference ST925522) is a 395.8 hectare biological and geological Site of Special Scientific Interest in Wiltshire, England, near the villages of Bratton and Edington, and about 3 miles (5 km) east of the town of Westbury. It was notified in 1971. The designated area consists mainly of chalk grassland, as well as some ancient woodland, and supports a diverse range of native flora and fauna. It overlays notable geological features—principally landforms created by glaciation in the Pleistocene.

Part of the land designated as Bratton Downs Site of Special Scientific Interest is owned by the Ministry of Defence.

== Location ==
The Bratton Downs SSSI includes parts of the Westbury, Combe, White Cliff, Picquet, Patcombe and Edington Hills, as well as the Combe Bottom, Longcombe Bottom and Lutcombe Bottom combes. The Wessex Ridgeway long-distance footpath passes through part of the SSSI. The Westbury White Horse is on the slope of Westbury Hill, on the edge of Bratton Downs. Bratton Camp, an Iron Age hill fort, stands on a 225-metre (738 ft) top immediately east of the horse; the fort is surrounded by the designated area but does not form part of it.

== Vegetation ==
The main species of grass is upright brome (Bromus erectus), though tor-grass (Brachypodium pinnatum) is also common. In areas of heavy grazing, sheep fescue (Festuca ovina) and meadow oat-grass (Helictotrichon pratense) can take over. Blue sedge (Carex flacca), spring sedge (Carex caryophyllea), dwarf thistle (Cirsium acaule), salad burnet (Sanguisorba minor), burnet saxifrage (Pimpinella saxifraga), and devil's bit (Succisa pratensis) are also common.

Common sainfoin (Onobrychis viciifolia), fern-leaf dropwort (Filipendula vulgaris), autumn lady's-tresses (Spiranthes spiralis), chalk milkwort (Polygala calcarea) and fragrant orchid (Gymnadenia conopsea) are notable grassland species that only grow in areas where fertilisers and herbicides have not been used for a long time.

Patches of scrub with emergent tree species have developed on slopes, common components of which are hawthorn (Crataegus sp.), buckthorn (Rhamnus spp.), blackthorn (Prunus spinosa), common holly (Ilex aquifolium), wayfaring tree (Viburnum lantana), ash (Fraxinus excelsior), whitebeam and field maple (Acer campestre). Ash and wych elm (Ulmus glabra) form two stands on north-facing slopes on the eastern margins of the downs. The ground cover in these woods contains several species typical of those found in ancient woodland.

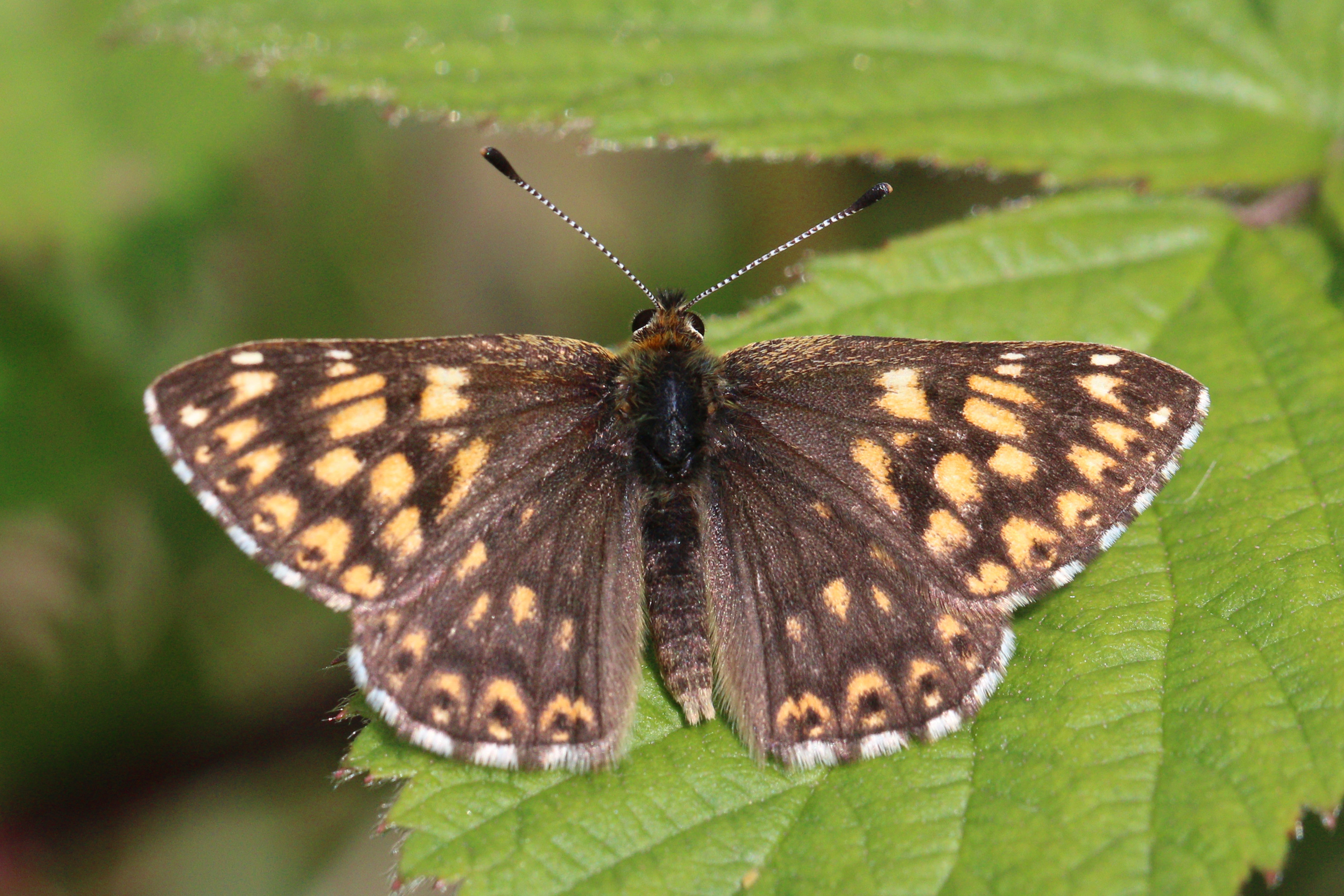
Duke of Burgundy butterfly

== Fauna ==
Notable bird species reported in the downs include the lesser whitethroat, common linnet, yellowhammer, goldcrest and European green woodpecker.

More than thirty species of butterfly have been reported from the area, several of which—the marsh fritillary (Euphydryas aurinia), Duke of Burgundy (Hamearis lucina), chalkhill blue (Polyommatus coridon), pearl-bordered fritillary (Boloria euphrosyne) and Adonis blue (Polyommatus bellargus)—are declining in the United Kingdom on account of habitat destruction. Other insects reported include the uncommon burrowing bug species Canthophorus dubius, the green forester (Adscita statices), cistus forester (A. geryon), and scarce forester (Jordanita globulariae).
