= Westbury White Horse =

Hill figure in England

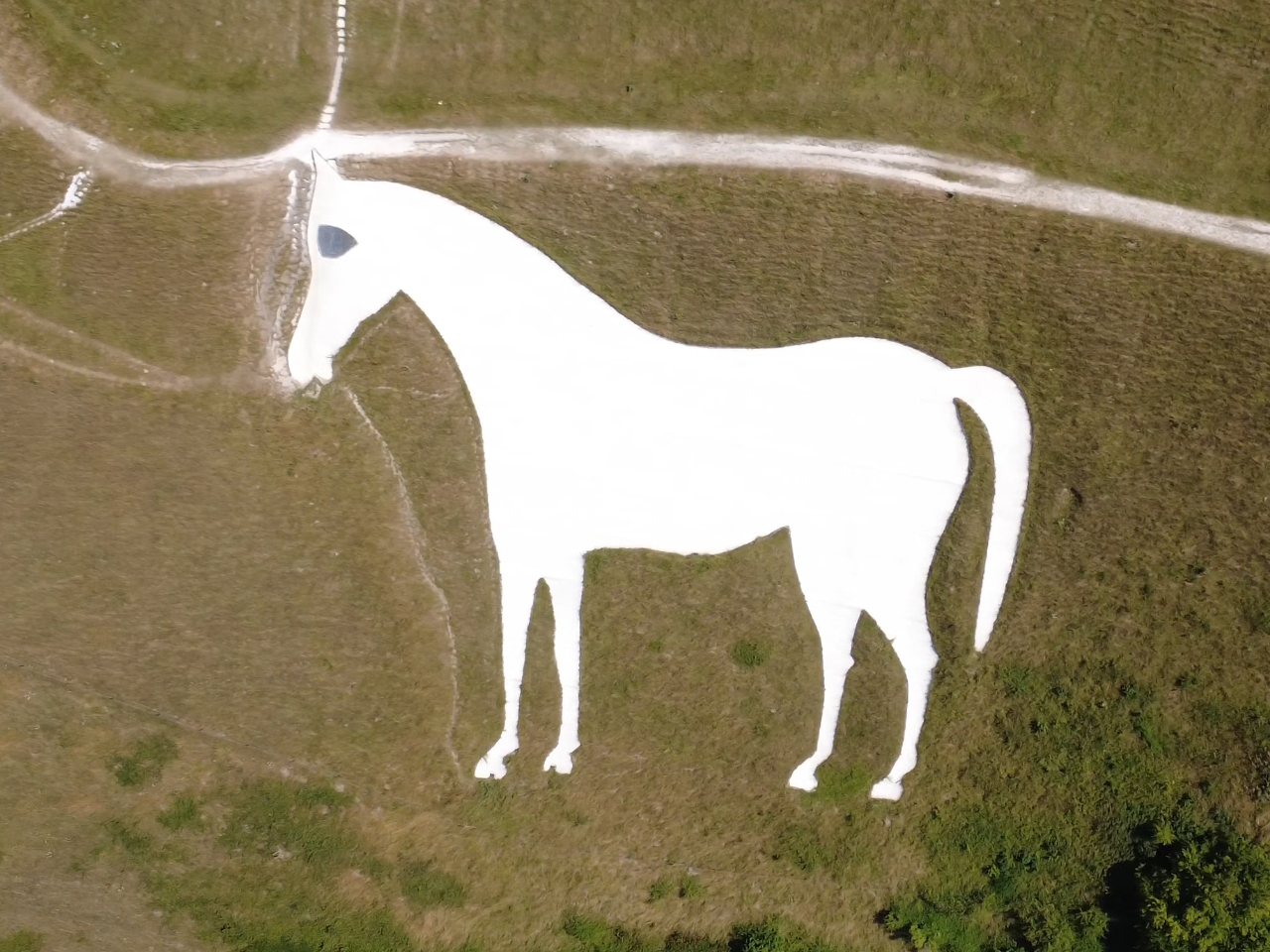
- Overhead view of Westbury White Horse in 2025

- Location in Wiltshire
- 51°15′50″N 2°08′48″W
- Type: Hill figure monument
- Location: Bratton Downs, Wiltshire, England

History
- Built: 1778

Site notes
- Material: Chalk
- Height: 55 metres (180 ft)
- Length: 52 metres (171 ft)
- Public access: Yes

The Westbury White Horse or Bratton White Horse is a hill figure on the escarpment of Salisbury Plain, approximately 1.5 miles (2.4 km) east of Westbury in Wiltshire, England. It is the oldest of eight white horses in Wiltshire, dating at least from the 18th century. It has been restored several times, and the work may have obliterated other white horse figures on the same slope. A small early 19th-century engraving shows a horse facing in the opposite direction. There is, however, no evidence for the existence of a chalk horse at Westbury before 1742, and it was reported then to have been created within living memory.

The horse is stated by the Wiltshire Victoria County History to be 163 ft (50 m) tall and 166 ft (51 m) long. It has been adopted as a symbol for the town of Westbury, appearing on welcome signs, and is also considered a symbol for Wiltshire as a whole.

== Location and name ==
The horse is on Westbury Hill, a steeply sloping hillside on the edge of the Bratton Downs, below the Iron Age hillfort called Bratton Castle, or Camp, and within clear sight of Westbury, but nearer to the village of Bratton. The horse is now just within the civil parish of Bratton, which was a tithing of the ancient parish of Westbury until 1894, when it became a separate civil parish.

The name "Westbury White Horse" has earlier sources than "Bratton White Horse", including one in 1801, but the Bratton name has been in use since at least the 1850s. In reporting on the dispute in 1934, the Wiltshire News wrote:

If you mention the Westbury White Horse in the parish of Bratton, the parishioners prick up their ears and say, "It's the Bratton White Horse." If you mention the Bratton White Horse in Westbury, the locals say they have never seen it."

== Origins ==
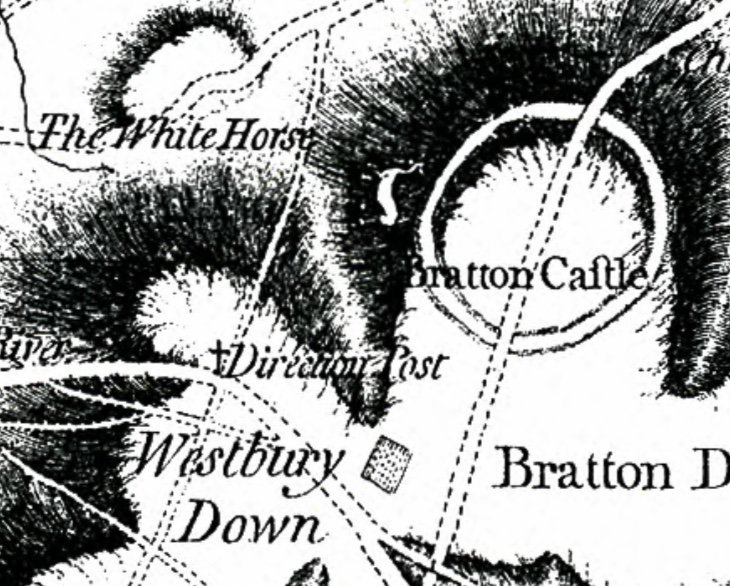
The horse as shown on the Andrews and Dury Map of 1773, facing north and left, and with long legs

The Westbury or Bratton White Horse is the oldest of the Wiltshire chalk horses, and its origins are obscure.

The definitive Wiltshire Victoria County History, volume 8 (1965) notes that "There is no evidence for the existence of a horse here before the early 18th century."

The horse is sometimes said to commemorate King Alfred's victory at the Battle of Ethandun in 878, but there is no trace of such a legend before the 18th century. Since the early 20th century, historians have mostly located the battle at Edington, some two miles (3.2 km) away from the white horse, but this theory is still open to debate. In Alfred and the Great White Horse of Wiltshire (1939), the Downside Abbey monk Dom Illtyd Trethowan debunked the suggested connection of the Westbury White Horse with Alfred and the Battle of Ethandune.

Another hillside chalk figure, the Uffington White Horse, is likely to have featured in King Alfred's early life, as he was born in the Vale of White Horse, not far from Uffington in Oxfordshire, and the horse is now known from archaeological work to date from the Bronze Age, although it is not certain that it was originally intended to be a horse. Unlike the recorded history of the Westbury horse, documents as early as the 11th century refer to the "White Horse Hill" at Uffington ("mons albi equi"). A white horse war standard was associated with the continental Saxons in the Dark Ages. In his 17th-century work Monumenta Britannica, John Aubrey connected the Uffington horse with Hengist and Horsa, stating that "the White Horse was their Standard at the Conquest of Britain". Aubrey, a Wiltshireman who studied the county's antiquities, mentions no chalk figures in Wiltshire even though he visited "Bratton Castle hill fort": he gives a good description of it, and a sketch which shows no chalk figure.

Bishop Edmund Gibson, who edited the edition of William Camden's Britannia of 1695, also says nothing of such a horse at Westbury. In his preface, Gibson identifies a local man, Thomas Tanner, as his main source: "The discoveries in Wiltshire depend upon the authority of Mr. Tanner, who has made considerable progress in the Antiquities of that County." This was noted by Sir Henry Ellis in 1843 and has been confirmed by later research.

During the 18th century, the White Horse of Hanover was a heraldic symbol associated with the new British royal family, the House of Hanover. Noting this, in 1904 Arthur Charles Fox-Davies wrote that "Everyone in this country is familiar with the expression "the white horse of Hanover". It is argued by some commentators that the Westbury White Horse may have been created in the early 18th century as a symbol of loyalty to the new Protestant reigning house.

The earliest mention of any chalk figure at Westbury is in a work by Francis Wise published at Oxford in 1742. He suggested a link with Alfred the Great for the Uffington horse, but not for the one at Westbury, having visited the town. He says of this horse:

I must give my readers a caution about it. For did not the fabrick discover it to be modern, yet the inhabitants of Westbury, a borough town about a mile from it, who made it and instituted a revel or festival thereupon, might inform them as much; it having been wrought within the memory of persons now living, or but very lately dead.

This suggests at the earliest a late-seventeenth-century origin for the figure.

In "The Scouring of the White Horse Country" (Wiltshire Archaeological and Natural History Magazine, 2005), Brian Edwards points out that ever since the 16th century, editions of Camden's Britannia had claimed that Edington in Wiltshire was the site of the Battle of Ethandun. While finding that the early 18th century probably saw the creation of the Westbury horse, Edwards suggests that it may have been cut then to commemorate the battle. This theory had been proposed in Tourist's Guide to Somersetshire, Rail and Road (1885), by Richard Nicholls Worth FGS:

On the slope of Bratton Down is Westbury White Horse, said to commemorate the defeat of the Danes under Guthrum by Alfred, but of doubtful antiquity. A very commendable Alfredian mania had rule in Somerset and Wilts in the latter half of the last century, of which Alfred's Tower and not improbably this memorial are both relics. Certainly the White Horse was re-edified then; and as the identification of this locality as the scene of the great victory is somewhat uncertain, we can hardly suspect the Saxons of perpetrating such a gigantic historic fraud, even by way of a joke.

In 1754, Richard Pococke visited Westbury and describes the horse:

To the north of the town on the side of the hill, near an old fortification call’d Bratton Castle, is a Horse cut of so large a size that it is seen some miles distant. It is made by cutting in pretty deep a few yards from the top of the hill, and being Chalk it shows to great advantage; they commonly go once a year to it from Westbury, about the 29th of May, and clean it from grass which would otherwise grow over it.

A large map of Wiltshire by John Andrews and Andrew Dury, published in several sheets in 1773, shows a Westbury horse facing to the left, and with long legs, as in the case of the present horse. The map was published on 1 January 1773, so the image seems likely to date from about 1772.

Richard Gough edited Anecdotes of British Topography (1768) and says in it "There is another White Horse under Bratton castle, Wiltshire, of very modern make." Some years later, he edited a new edition, British Topography (1780), and by then had changed his mind:

There is another White Horse under Bratton-castle, Wiltshire, which Mr. Wise supposes (though certainly without good grounds) of very modern make.

Gough went on to edit two editions of Camden's Britannia, published in 1789 and 1806, in which he took a more detailed interest in the two chalk horses. In his 1789 edition, he supports a connection between the Uffington horse and the Battle of Ashdown. He also says he surveyed the Westbury horse in 1772 and gives this description of it:

On the south-west face of the hill is a most curious monument unnoticed by Bishop Gibson: a white horse in a walking attitude cut out of the chalk, fifty-four feet high from his toe to his chest, and to the tip of his ear near one hundred feet high, and from ear to tail one hundred feet long: an undoubted memorial of this important victory, and like that by which Alfred commemorated his first great victory in Berkshire eight years before. The whole of this figure is hollowed out of the chalk, and not marked with outlines so hollowed, as Mr. Wise seems to insinuate the Berkshire horse is."

This gives a size smaller than the measurements of the present horse, and Gough mentions no design or features, apart from the whole figure being hollowed out of the chalk. He adds that he disagrees with Wise, comparing the Westbury horse with the one at Uffington.

== The Gee horse ==
What may be the first mention of a redesign of the Westbury horse by a Mr Gee comes in Richard Harris's History of Westbury, written about 1823. Harris says the horse was "new modelled by a Mr Gee, when he surveyed the parish of Westbury for the Earl of Abingdon", assigning this to 1778; but in the same work he also says that the work was "executed by a Mr Gee who surveyed the Parish of Westbury in the year of 1788". Harris makes no suggestion that Gee was hired or paid by Abingdon for his work on the horse, instead saying of it "the expence ... was raised by Subscription by the Gentn. of the Parish in 1788". Richard Gee (1756–1811), a surveyor of Turvey, Bedfordshire, carried out survey work at Westbury for Willoughby Bertie, 4th Earl of Abingdon, between September 1787 and May 1788, rendering an account for 480 days of work, for which he charged £230 17s 6d. (equivalent to £30,100 in 2025). Gee's account book survives and has its first entries in the year 1784.

The figures given by Gough for the survey he says he carried out in 1772 appear to show that there was a later increase in the height and length of the horse, by about sixty-five feet in each case, and this is ascribed to Gee. All authorities on the horse agree that a Mr Gee redesigned it, overlaying an older chalk figure which was smaller, resulting in something very like the present horse.

== The Gough horse ==
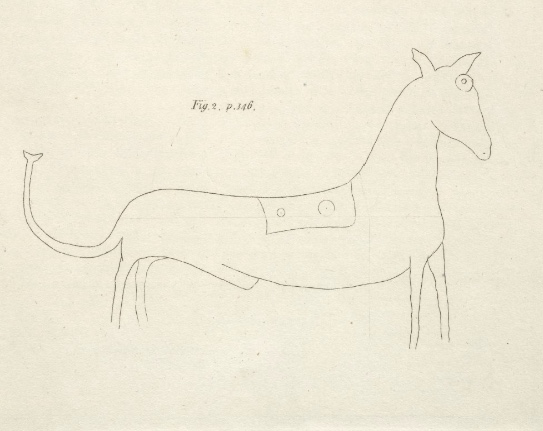
The "Gough horse", an image from Plate XIII of volume I of Camden's Britannia (1806)

In his second edition of Camden's Britannia, published in 1806, Gough prints a small engraving (pictured), which shows a horse with a saddle and very short legs facing to the right, at least in part an outline figure and not a solid one, which is at odds with his survey of 1772 and his description of 1789. He offers no comment on this image, so does not explain the discrepancies.

There is a widespread view that the first Westbury White Horse faced to the right, but the only basis for this appears to be the Gough image of 1806. William Plenderleath, who came down in favour of the Gough horse of the 1806 edition having existed, did not believe it had faced to the right, stating:

Now it is scarcely likely that Mr. Gee when recutting the horse would have taken the trouble to turn it round, which would have involved a vast amount of patching and piecing of the turf. A more probable explanation is that the engraver of Mr. Gough’s representation transferred his drawing to the wood as it stood, instead of reversing it.

Morris Marples, in his White Horses and Other Hill Figures (1949), takes the view that the date of the Westbury horse is "about 1700 or perhaps a little earlier". For him, it follows that if the "peculiar figure, so unlike any other known representation of the horse" ever existed, then it was "a deliberate fake, perhaps even a practical joke".

In "The Lost Horse of Westbury" (3rd Stone, 1999), Dr Duncan Egdell points out that the drawing Gough published confuses solid and outline figures. He adds that

A further indictment of Gough's drawing stems from comparison with the horse's dimensions which he himself quotes… Such figures are self-evidently incompatible with the sketch.

Brian Edwards (2005) comments

Gough, however, reveals the strength of the preconceived longing to impose a Saxon heritage in the description of the Westbury figure in his 1806 edition.

== 19th century ==
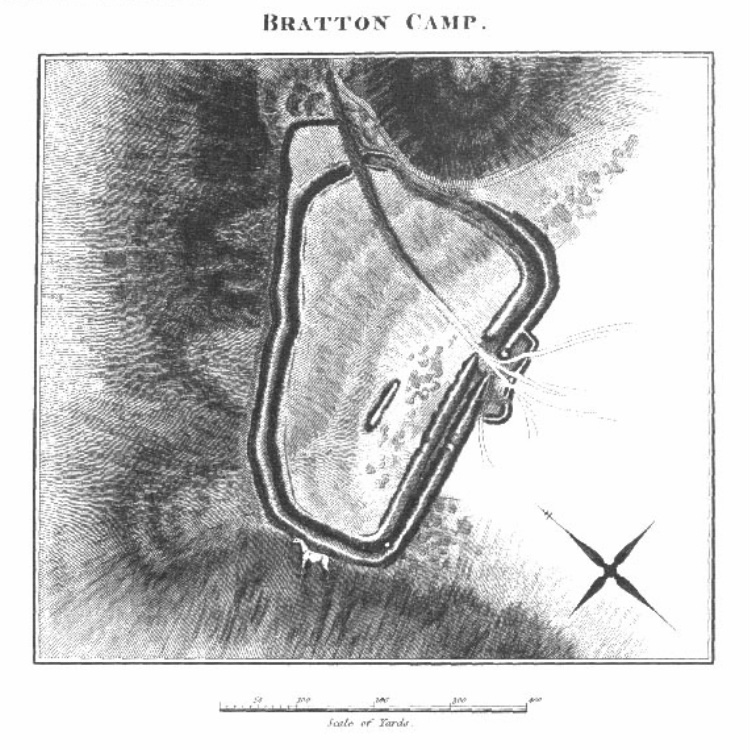
The white horse at the foot of an engraving of Bratton Camp in Colt Hoare's Ancient History of South Wiltshire (1812)

A fox hunting report in a London newspaper of October 1801 mentions the "Westbury White Horse" by that name.

Richard Colt Hoare's Ancient History of South Wiltshire (1812) has an engraving of Bratton Camp which includes a horse very similar to the present-day one, which Marples says is "in approximately the same attitude as the present horse".

During the 19th century, the horse was periodically reshaped and repaired.

In 1849, the Express of London noted

Under the shadow of the White Horse, in one of the pleasantest valleys of Wiltshire, lies the little irregular town or village of Westbury. It is a place of small extent, no importance, and with but one attraction. As you turn into it the figure of the gigantic horse, cut out ages ago by our Saxon ancestors, in the down upon the chalky hill side, becomes startlingly visible.

In 1855, a passenger waiting at Westbury railway station wrote to the Monmouthshire Beacon, "I looked on the hills, veiled as they were by the mist; when, lo! the mist cleared off, and disclosed in all his beauty and excellent symmetry the celebrated chalk horse of the Westbury Downs, exquisitely cut…"

Gough's claim that the horse commemorated the Battle of Ethandune was repeated in a booklet published by a local printer, William Michael, in 1864. Most of his local history booklets were written by Canon J. E. Jackson.

By 1872, the horse was considered to have lost its shape, by the chalk repeatedly growing over and being re-cut. In November 1872 came an announcement in the Warminster Herald that a committee had been formed "for cleansing and remodelling the White Horse", and that subscriptions were invited. In May 1873 came reports that "A large sum of money has been laid out on the scouring of the White Horse on Bratton Down" and that tons of earth and turf had been removed and new chalk added. Later in 1873, the horse was remodelled, and at the same time substantial edging-stones were added all around the perimeter. This work cost about £65 (equivalent to £6,111 in 2025) and has prevented the outline of the horse from changing since then.

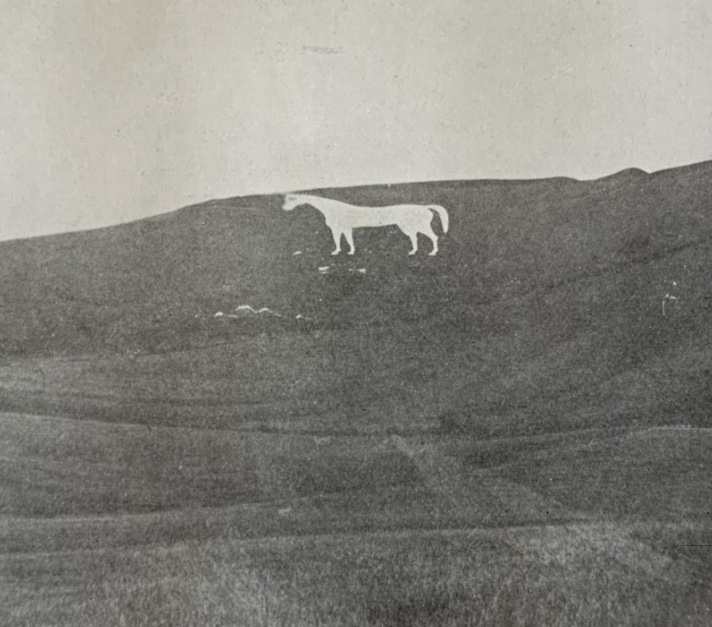
The Westbury White Horse by Francis Frith, late 19th century

== 20th century ==
A Westbury White Horse Committee was in existence in 1903, when it announced that it had accepted an estimate for "cleaning the horse, detailing its eye, and putting concrete in a few places."

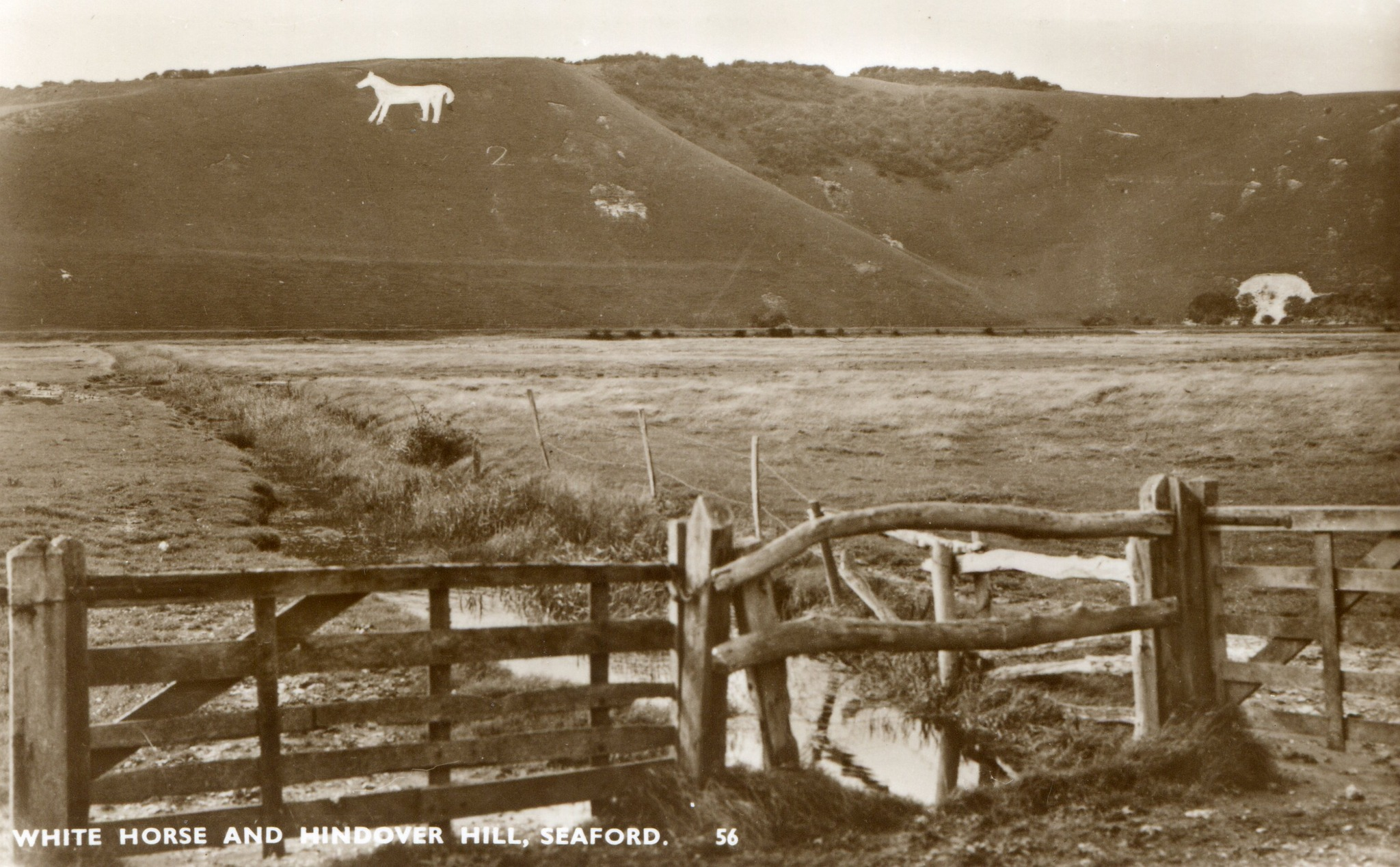
The Litlington White Horse was inspired by the Westbury White Horse

In 1924, the horse was used as inspiration for the design of the Litlington White Horse in East Sussex, which until 1983, when it was changed from a standing position to a prancing position, was visually similar to the Westbury horse.

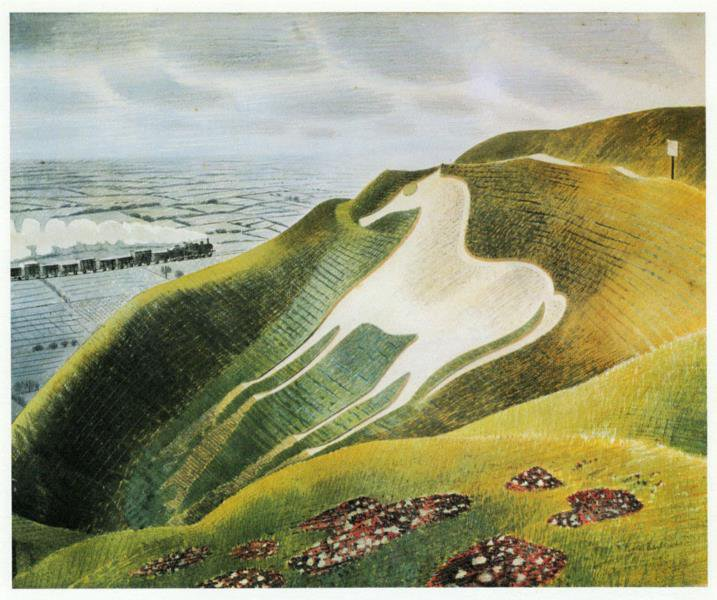
The horse by Eric Ravilious, 1939

In 1939, the horse was depicted by the artist Eric Ravilious in his watercolour paintings "Train Landscape" and "The Westbury Horse".

During the Second World War, the chalk of the horse was turfed over to prevent the Luftwaffe from using it for navigation. Nearby Westbury railway station was considered to be a potential target.

In May 1949, Morris Marples came under attack in the Wiltshire Times for concluding in his book on chalk figures that the first Westbury horse dated from "about 1700". He defended his view robustly.

The horse was illuminated at night in 1900 and again in 1950, both times using British army equipment. For the 1950 event, which used searchlights, traffic in Westbury and Bratton almost came to a standstill as drivers slowed down to look.

In 1957 the horse was concreted over and painted white by Westbury Urban District Council, in an attempt to save on long-term maintenance costs, as the chalk of the face was eroding and unstable, due to the steepness of the slope. Since then, the concrete has tended to turn grey and deteriorate over time, requiring regular cleaning, as well as periodic repairs and repainting. The horse was thoroughly cleaned in 1993, and in 1995 the concrete facing from 1957 was replaced and repainted.

== 21st century ==
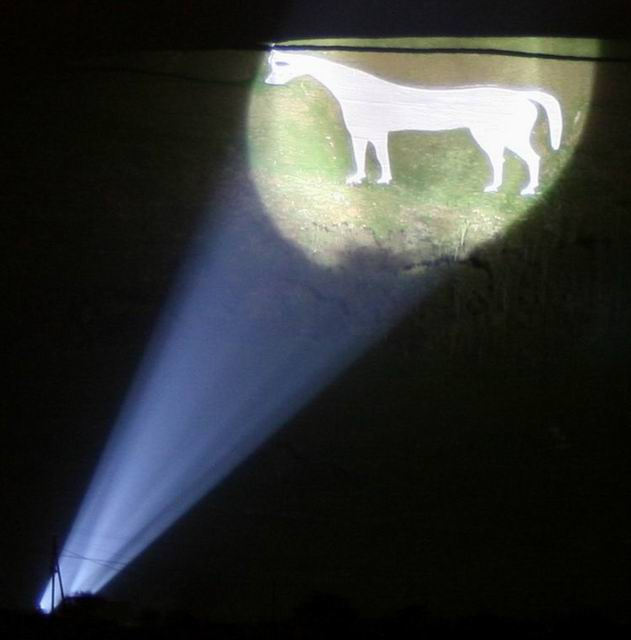
The horse illuminated at night in 2006

In 2003, the horse was vandalised when "Stop This War" was written in yellow across it in capital letters in protest of the Iraq War. After the words were removed, the horse was noticeably grey with a white horizontal strip where the message had been. In November 2006, the horse was repaired and repainted again. The newly whitened horse was illuminated on the night the repairs were finished, by Second World War searchlights, as in 1950.

In July 2010, the neck of the horse was vandalised when the word "wonkey" was written across it. This part of the neck had to be re-whitened in 2010, leading to the horse having a whiter neck than the rest of the body.

The horse was cleaned again in May 2012, for the Diamond Jubilee of Queen Elizabeth II. To mark the completion of the work, again the horse was lit up with searchlights.

Two visitor information signs, on the hill above the horse and in the viewing area car park, were placed in 1999 following the completion of Devizes White Horse; the signs show all eight Wiltshire White Horses. Also on the side of the hill is a toposcope dated 1968, mounted on a small stone structure, which identifies the towns and cities that can be seen from the hillside. For the Golden Jubilee of Queen Elizabeth II, a fire beacon was placed to the side of the road on the top of the hill leading to the car park on 3 June 2002, that resembles the millennium beacons. It is lit to mark occasions such as the 70th anniversary of VE Day on 8 May 2015.

BBC News had a video in June 2018 showing the horse being cleaned with high pressure water jets by up to 18 volunteer abseilers. The cost was given as £3,000, paid for by Westbury Town Council. It stated that the previous clean was in 2016. In July 2023 the horse was cleaned, repainted and repaired again, with water used to clean off algae and dirt in a project funded by English Heritage. The cost was not made public, but the paint alone cost £25,000.

== Views ==
The Horse can be viewed from the west from up to 16–17 miles (26–27 km) away. From the Bratton Downs above the horse, Westbury and Trowbridge can be seen. The Mendip TV Mast on the Mendip Hills in Somerset can be seen clearly to the west, particularly at night. Two of the furthest views of the horse are said to be from Beckford's Tower in Bath and from the tower of St Michael's Church, Dundry near Bristol.

A car park on Bratton Road (B3098) which passes beneath the horse is known as Westbury White Horse Viewing Area. It has fifteen parking spaces and information boards on the horse.

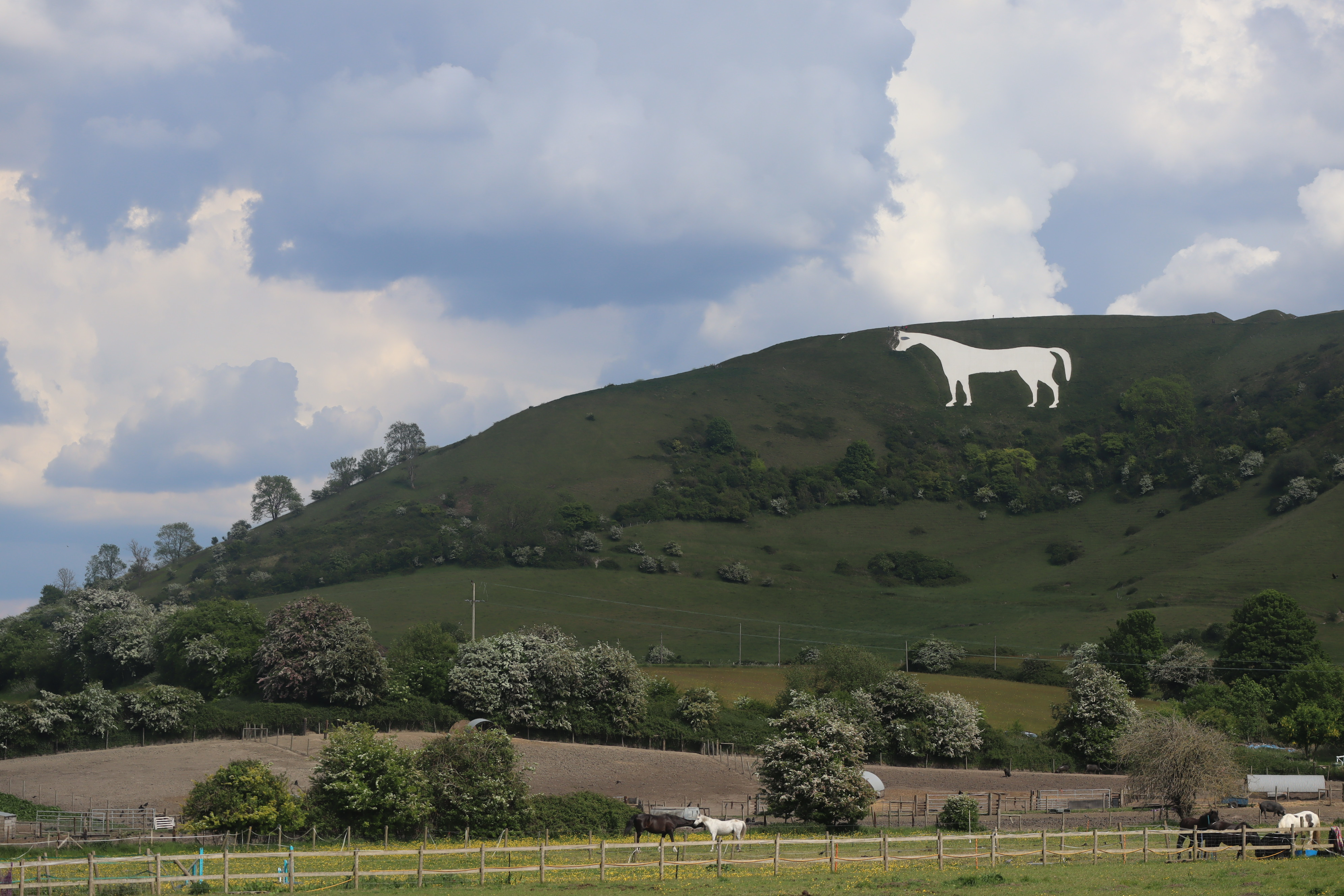
The horse seen from the viewing point off the B3098

For some 55 years, a 400-foot-tall (122 m) cement works chimney stood on lower ground about half a mile from the white horse and was the most prominent feature of the view from above it. Built in 1961, the factory and its chimney were last in use in 2010 and were demolished in 2016, to mixed views.

A Battle of Ethandun Memorial, consisting of a large sarsen stone and a metal commemorative plaque, was unveiled on 5 November 2000 by Alexander Thynn, 7th Marquess of Bath.

== In popular culture ==
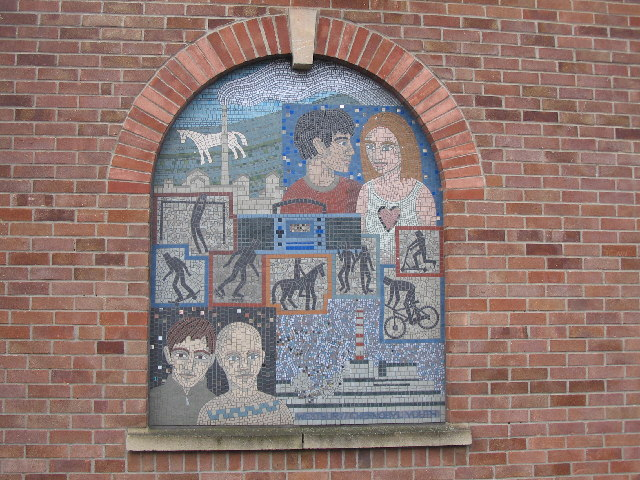
A mosaic in Edward Street, Westbury, shows the white horse with the former Cement Works chimney (now demolished) standing in front of it.

The Westbury White Horse was referenced in The Tontine (1955) by Thomas B. Costain, The Emigrants (1980) by George Lamming, and The English Patient (1992) by Michael Ondaatje, as the place where the sapper Kip learned how to deactivate bombs. Michael Morpurgo mentioned it as one of the inspirations for The Butterfly Lion.

The figure can be seen in the music video for Scottish guitarist Midge Ure's 1996 single "Breathe", as well as in the music video to the instrumental piece "The Journey" by the hammered dulcimer band Dulci Girls, and is featured in the current opening titles of the regional television news programme ITV News West Country. It was also seen in a 2015 Visit England advertisement produced in association with the England rugby team.

The horse lends its name to the White Horse Business Park outside Trowbridge and the White Horse Country Park outside Westbury, from both of which there are views of it.

== In folklore ==
A mile to the north-east of the white horse is the valley of Luccombe, which has a locally famed "Blood Stone", said to be connected with the massacre of Danish prisoners after a battle.

Wiltshire folklore has it that when the nearby Bratton church clock strikes midnight, the white horse goes down to the Bridewell or Briddle Springs (Note: Bridewell is pronounced locally as if it is spelt "Briddle", and as such, the springs are also known as the Briddle Springs.) below the hill, to drink.

== Gallery ==
Flag of the Electorate of Hanover, which may have inspired the creation of the horse

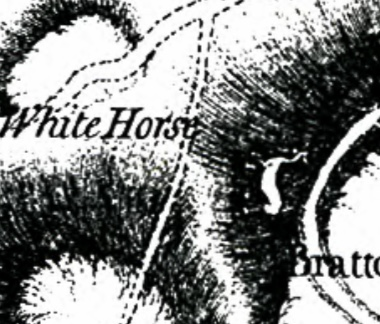
Detail of the White Horse as shown by the Andrews and Dury Map of Wiltshire, 1773

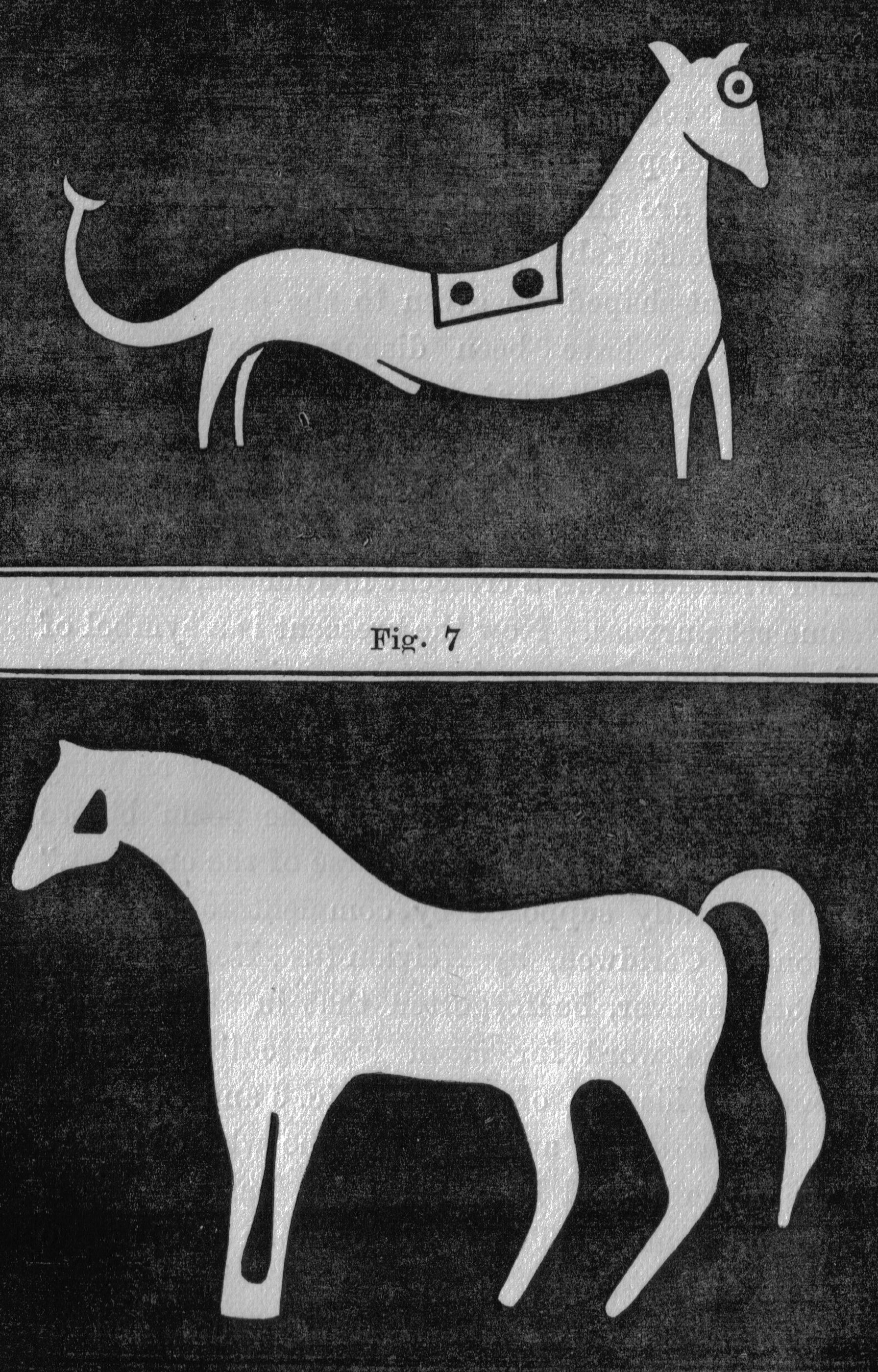
Plenderleath's interpretation of the Gough Horse of 1806 (top), and an image of the horse of about 1870 as illustrated by Plenderleath (bottom)

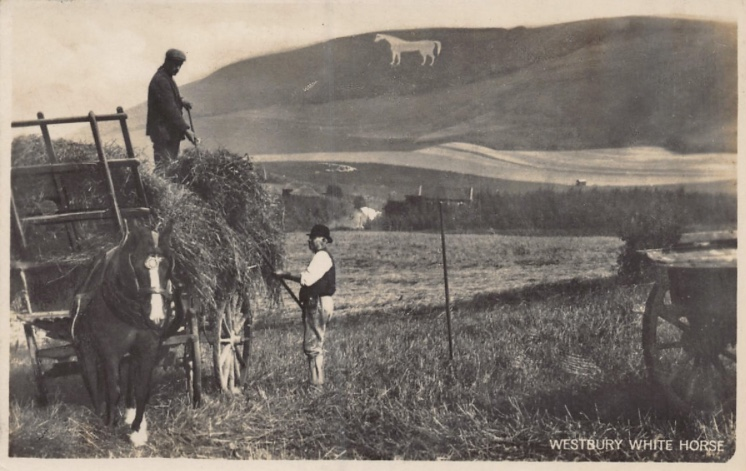
Photo of the horse by Richard Wilkinson, c. 1900

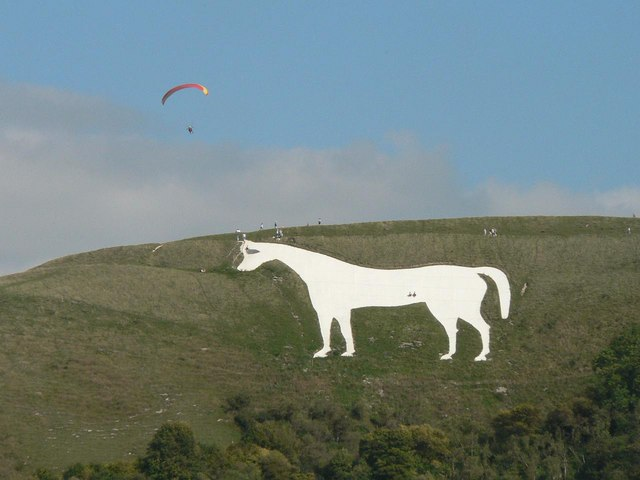
Paragliding above Westbury White Horse (August 2007)

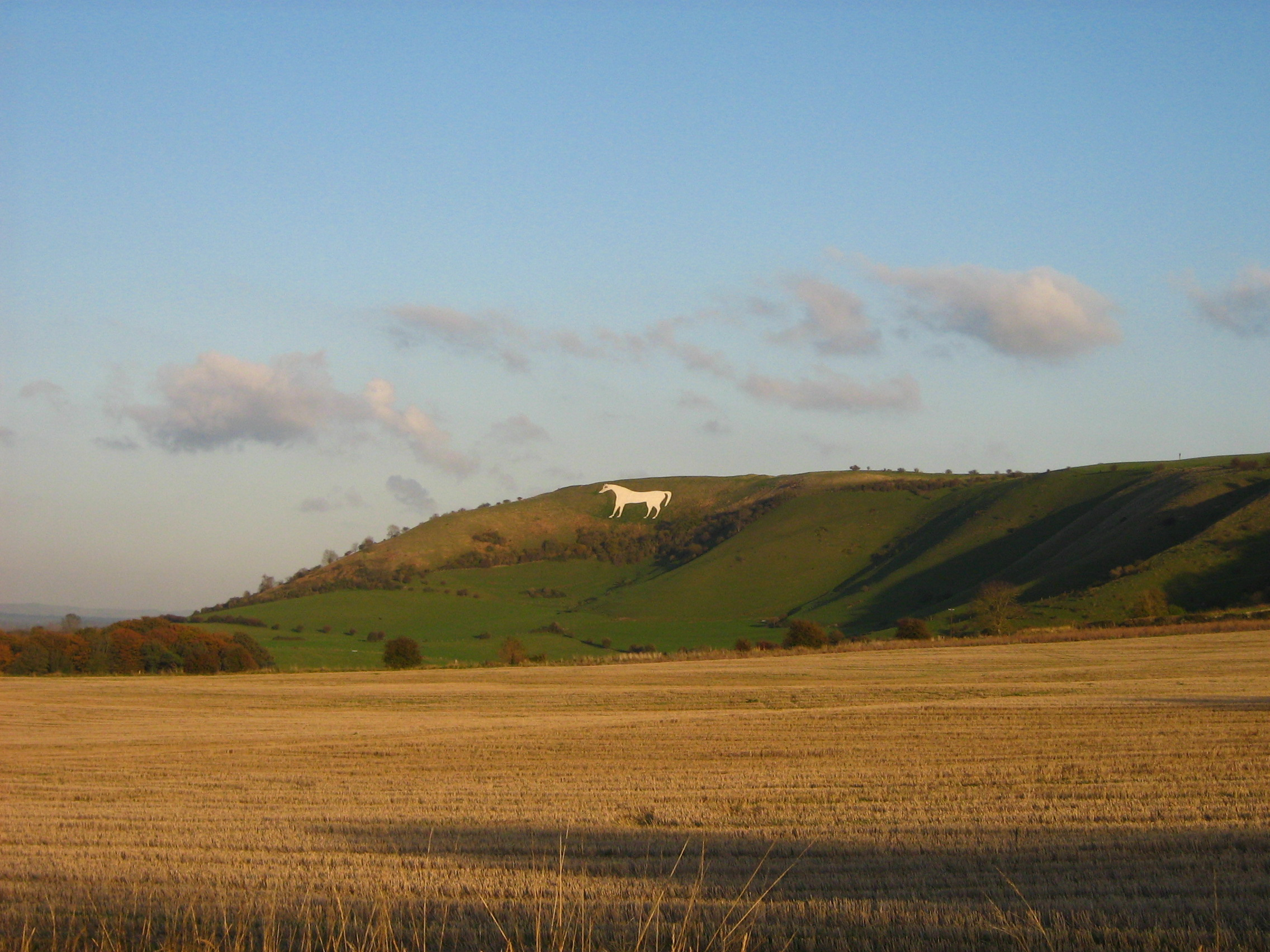
An autumnal view of Westbury White Horse on the edge of Bratton Castle (October 2008)

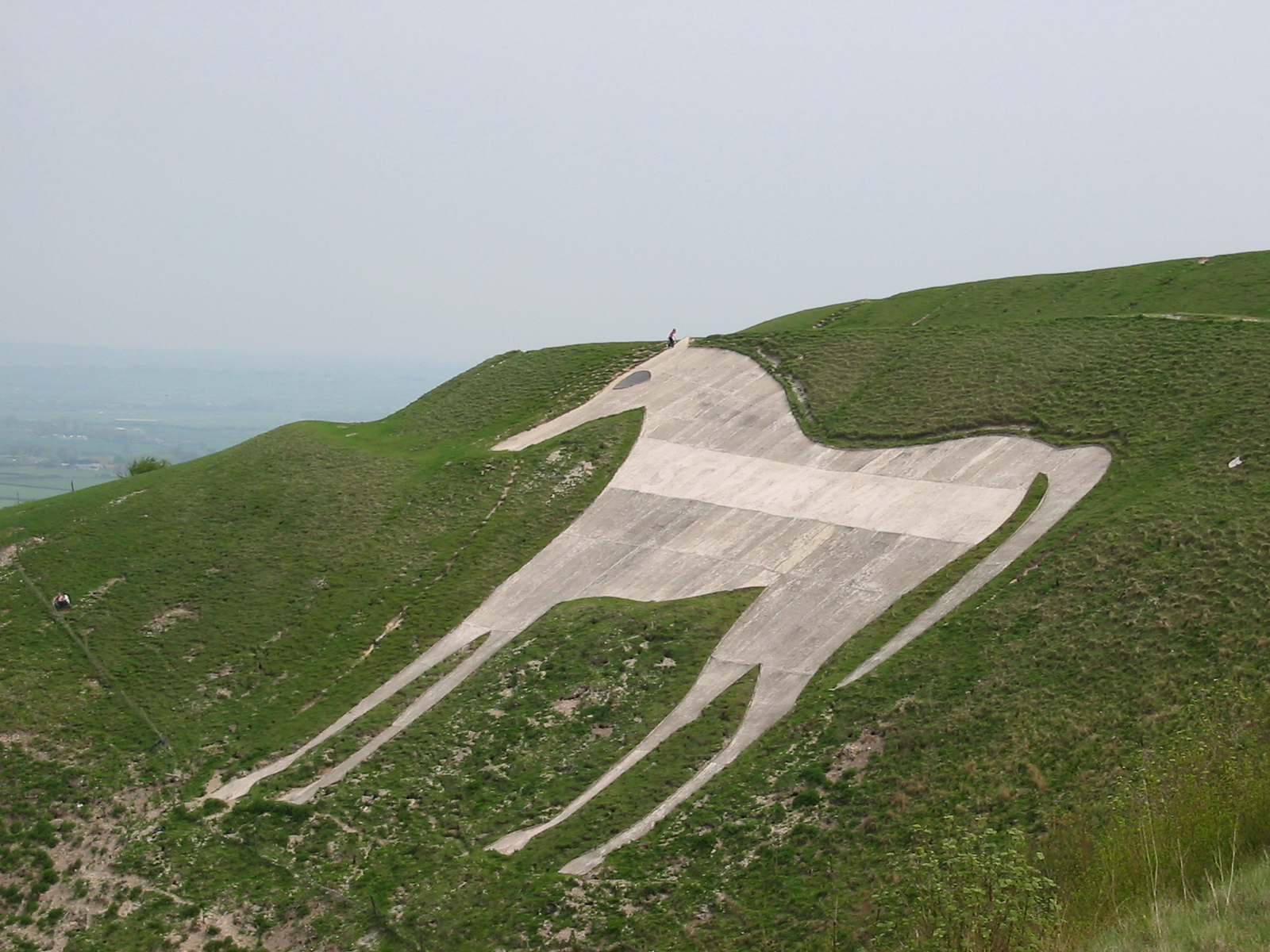
Viewed from near the edge of Bratton Downs before the surface treatment of 2007

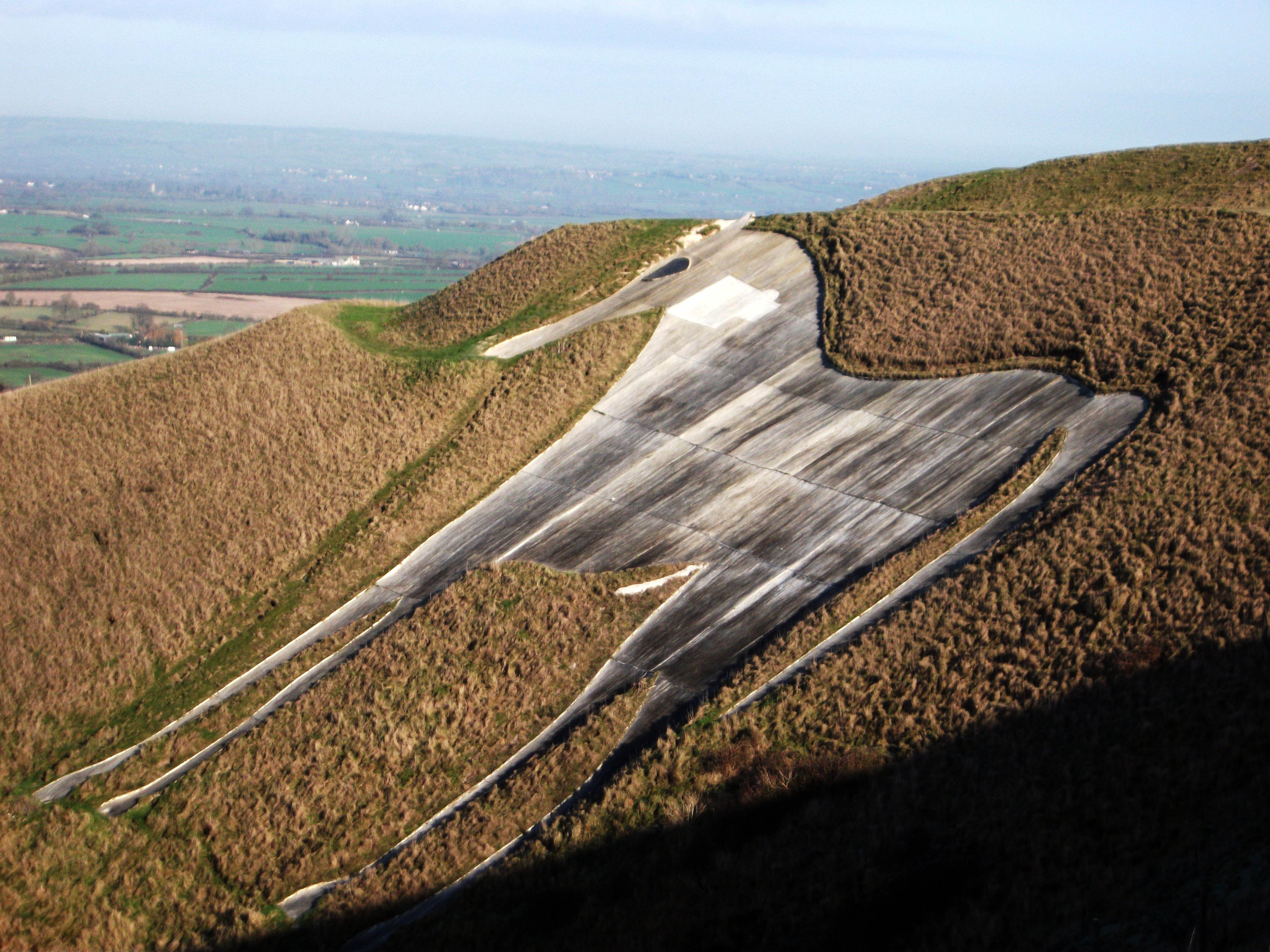
The horse in 2012, less than four years after restoration

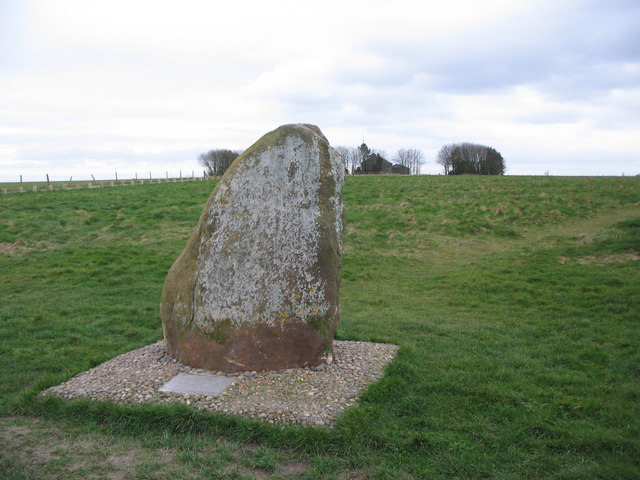
The Battle of Ethandun Memorial

== See also ==
- List of hill figures in Wiltshire
- Cherhill White Horse
- Marlborough White Horse
- Litlington White Horse
- Mormond Hill White Horse

== Bibliography ==
- Francis Wise, Further Observations on the White Horse and other Antiquities in Berkshire (Oxford: Thomas Wood, 1742)
- William Plenderleath, "On the White Horses of Wiltshire and its Neighbourhood" (Wiltshire Archaeological and Natural History Magazine, 1872), pp. 12–30
  - White Horses of the West of England (1885)
  - White Horses of the West of England (London: Allen & Storr, second edition, 1892)
- Morris Marples, White Horses and Other Hill Figures (London: Country Life, 1949)
- Paul Newman, Gods and Graven Images: The Chalk Hill-Figures of Britain (London: Robert Hale, 1987), pp. 54–61
- Kate Bergamar, Discovering Hill Figures (Princes Risborough: Shire, 4th ed., 1997), pp. 90–94
- Duncan Egdell, "The Lost Horse of Westbury" in 3rd Stone, Issue 36 (October–November 1999), pp. 27–30
- Brian Edwards, "The Scouring of the White Horse Country" in Wiltshire Archaeological and Natural History Magazine, 2005
- David Clensy, Walking the White Horses: Wiltshire's White Horse Trail on Foot (Clensy, 2023, ISBN 979-8864360187)
