= Vivien ap Rhys Pryce =

British artist

Vivien Mary ap Rhys Pryce (born 1 November 1937) is a British sculptor. ap Rhys Pryce has created large public works, including fountains, and also designed medals and trophies. She is a Fellow of the Royal Society of British Sculptors.

== Biography ==
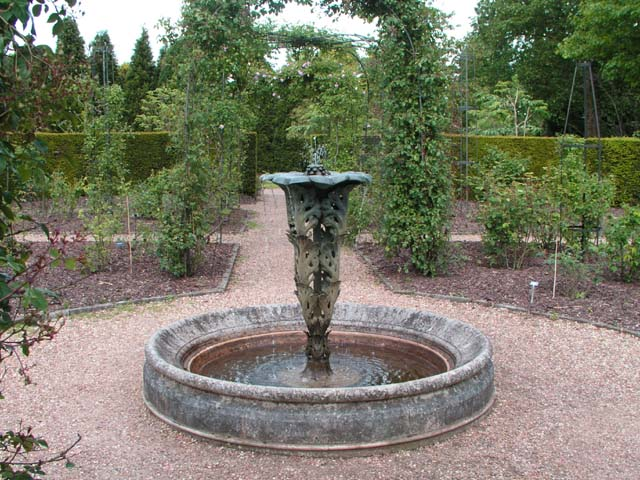
Rose Garden fountain, Nymans

ap Rhys Pryce was born at Woking in Surrey and from 1955 to 1957 studied at the City and Guilds of London Art School and then at the Edinburgh College of Art under Eric Schilsky. In 1957 she won a travelling scholarship, further awards followed in 1961 and in 1964 she was awarded the Feodora Gleichen Award by the Royal Society of British Sculptors. ap Rhys Pryce became an Associate member of the Society in 1965 and was elected a Fellow in 1972. During the early 1960s ap Rhys Price taught art at the Elmhurst Ballet School and later held a lecturer post at Twickenham College of Technology between 1970 and 1972. Works by ap Rhys Pryce have been shown at several commercial galleries, notably the Jonathan Poole Gallery, and she has also regularly exhibited at the Royal Academy in London, at the Royal Glasgow Institute of the Fine Arts, the Royal West of England Academy and with the New English Art Club.

ap Rhys Pryce's public commissions include designs for sporting medals and Trophies including for the 1969 John Player Cricket League and the Players No.6 Rugby League Trophy. Larger public commissions include the 1988 Minoprio Fountain at the University of Exeter and the 1989 Rose Garden fountain on the Nymans estate in West Sussex. The Museum of New Zealand Te Papa Tongarewa also holds an example of her work.
