= Bratton Castle =

Iron Age hillfort in Wiltshire, England

- Bratton Camp
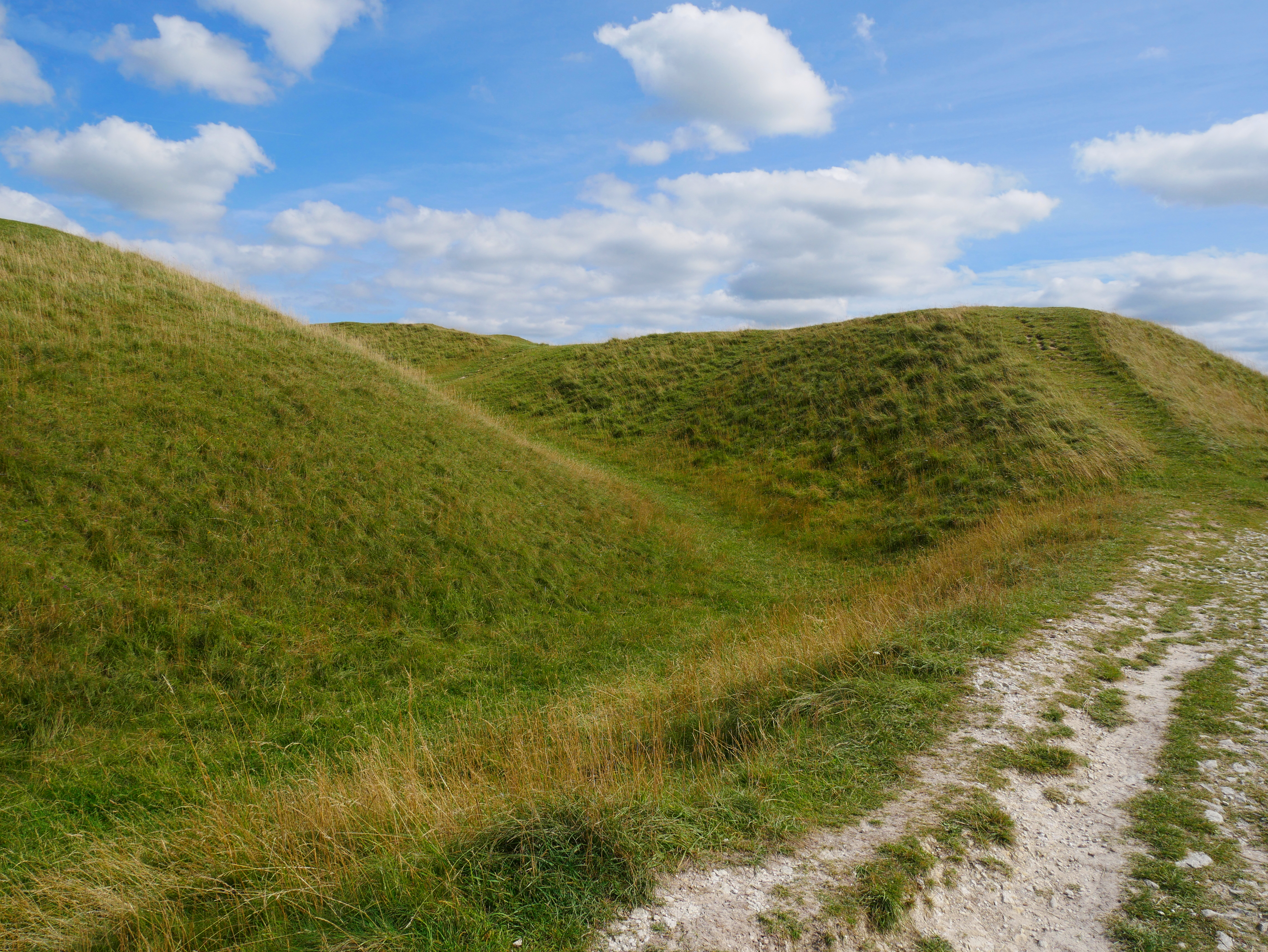
- The two banks along the southern side of the hillfort

- Location within Wiltshire
- 51.2637°N 2.1435°W
- Periods: Bronze Age, Iron Age
- Location: Wiltshire

Site notes
- Area: 25 acres (10 ha)
- Excavation dates: yes
- Archaeologists: William Cunnington; Sir Richard Colt Hoare; Jeffery Whittaker
- Condition: good
- Owner: English Heritage
- Public access: yes
- Website: www.english-heritage.org.uk/daysout/properties/bratton-camp-and-white-horse/

Bratton Castle (also known as Bratton Camp) is a bivallate (two ramparts) Iron Age built hill fort on Bratton Down, at the western edge of the Salisbury Plain escarpment. The hill fort comprises two circuits of ditch and bank which together enclose a pentagonal area of 9.3 hectares (23 acres).

The Westbury White Horse, a hill figure first documented in 1742, lies on the west side of the hill fort.

== Background ==
Hill forts developed in the Late Bronze and Early Iron Age, roughly the start of the first millennium BC. The reason for their emergence in Britain, and their purpose, has been a subject of debate. It has been argued that they could have been military sites constructed in response to invasion from continental Europe, sites built by invaders, or a military reaction to social tensions caused by an increasing population and consequent pressure on agriculture. The dominant view since the 1960s has been that the increasing use of iron led to social changes in Britain. Deposits of iron ore were located in different places to the tin and copper ore necessary to make bronze, and as a result trading patterns shifted and the old elites lost their economic and social status. Power passed into the hands of a new group of people. Archaeologist Barry Cunliffe believes that population increase still played a role and has stated "[the forts] provided defensive possibilities for the community at those times when the stress [of an increasing population] burst out into open warfare. But I wouldn't see them as having been built because there was a state of war. They would be functional as defensive strongholds when there were tensions and undoubtedly some of them were attacked and destroyed, but this was not the only, or even the most significant, factor in their construction".

== Description ==
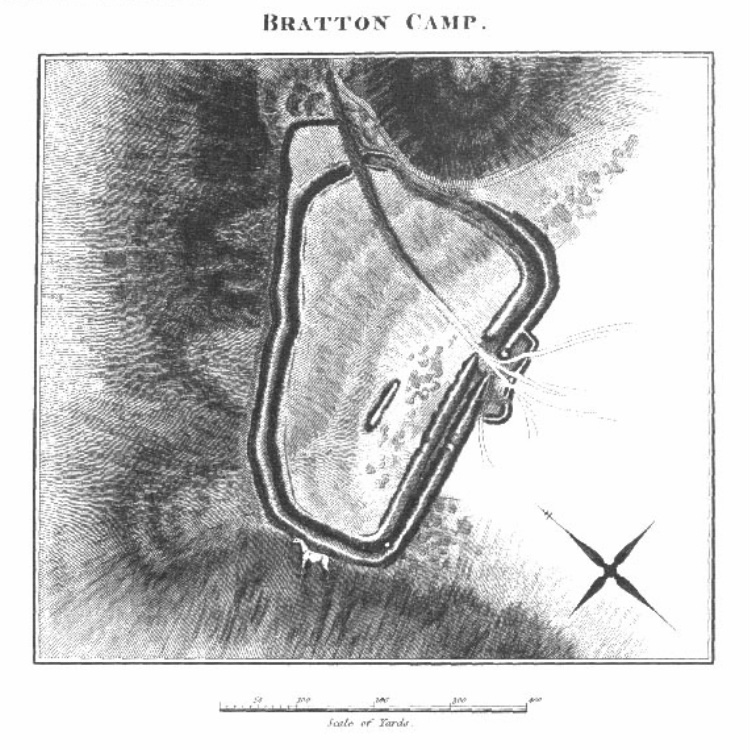
Engraving of Bratton Camp from The Ancient History of South Wiltshire by Sir Richard Colt Hoare

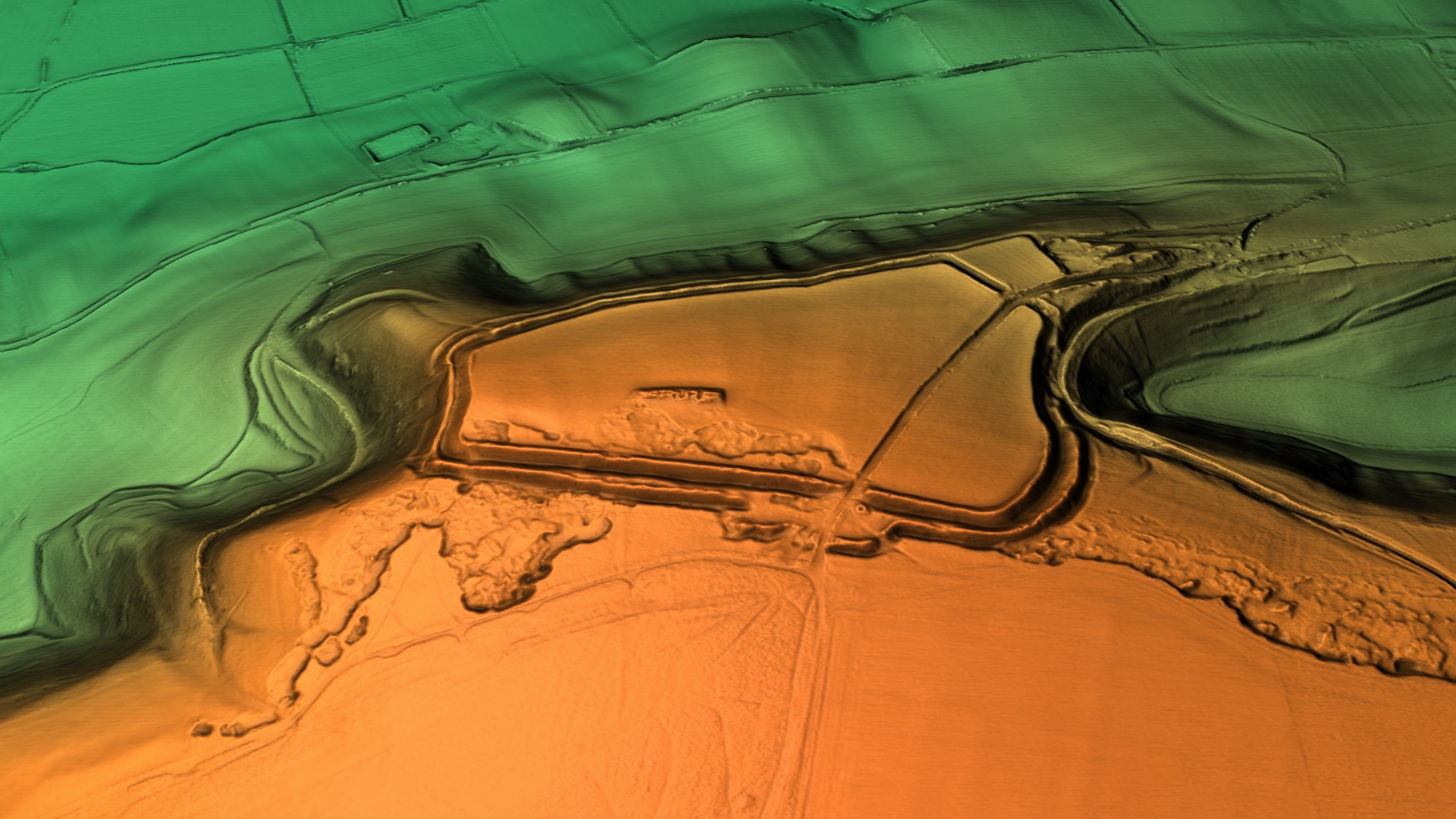
3D view of the digital terrain model

The short west side and the long north side occupy the crest of steep escarpment slopes and the ditches are stepped one above the other, the rampart slopes rising 5 metres (16 ft) and 6 metres (20 ft) above the base of the ditches. The defences here span a total width of 30 metres (98 ft). The south side of the hill fort and the southern half of the east side cross Bratton Down and here the twin ramparts are of roughly equal height and 30 metres (98 ft) in width. The northern half of the east side crosses the head of a re-entrant valley where the outer rampart and ditch have been largely destroyed by quarrying or landslips and the construction of a farm track. The short north east side straddles a narrow steep-sided ridge up which runs the Port Way. This passes through a possible original entrance, at which point the two ramparts have separated to form a small annexe, the outer ditch of which has, in places, been removed by quarrying. Quarrying has, in the past, also taken place within parts of the interior of the fort.

== Archaeology ==
John Aubrey (1626–1697), a Wiltshireman who studied the county's antiquities, visited what he called the Bratton Castle hill fort and in his Monumenta Britannica gives a good description of it, including a sketch, neither of which mentions a White Horse.

In the Camden's Britannia edition of 1695, Edmund Gibson, relying on a local man, Thomas Tanner, says

… it is seated upon the extremity of a high hill which commands all the country, being encompass'd with two deep ditches and rampires proportionable. The form of it is oval, in length 350 paces, and almost 200 broad in the widest part. Near the middle of it is a large oblong barrow, 60 paces long, prabably the burying-place of some of the Danish Nobility here slain. Within this vast Entrenchment, there have been several pieces of old Iron-armour plough'd up. It hath but two entrances, fortify'd with out-works; the one toward the south-east, opening to the plain; the other toward the north-east, leading directly down to Eddington.

The hillfort was one of the sites excavated by Jeffery Whittaker prior to 1775, which is thought to have been one of the earliest archaeological excavations to have taken place in Wiltshire. The excavation was poorly documented but it is believed that Roman and Saxon coins were found in the vicinity of the fort. Later excavations were carried out by William Cunnington and Sir Richard Colt Hoare: three barrows within and around the castle were excavated and recorded.

=== Bratton G1 ===
A long barrow, within which was found two primary cremations on a platform with a pile of pebble stones and one chalk bead covered with 'vegetable earth', intermixed with pottery and animal bones at four and five feet deep. Three secondary inhumations were found near the top.

=== Bratton G2 ===
A bowl barrow containing two cremation urns, one placed within the other, and an interment of burnt bones. The large urn was broken in pieces; the small one, containing about three pints was better preserved and is contained within the Wiltshire Heritage Museum. It is described as particular in its shape, having a perforated and projecting handle.

=== Bratton G8a ===
A small round barrow less than one foot high, which contained a circular cist with a crouched skeleton, but no relics. The skull is at Cambridge Museum.

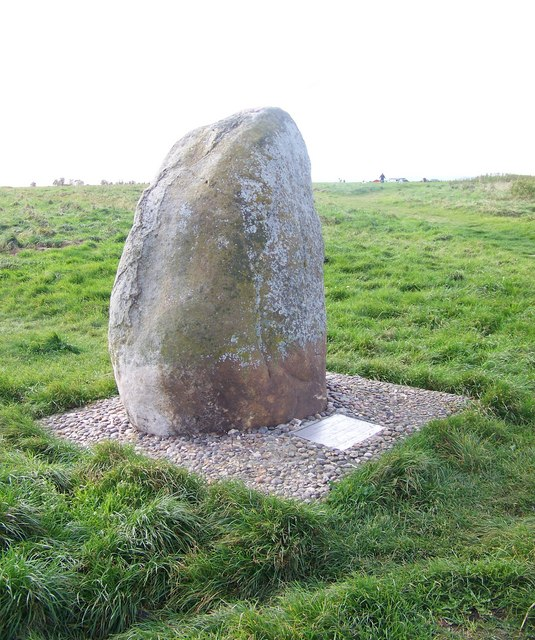
The Memorial to the Battle of Ethandun is a sarsen stone standing in a corner of the public recreation area adjacent to Bratton Castle

== Location ==
The site is at grid reference ST90125164, to the south-west of the village and parish of Bratton, in the county of Wiltshire. The hill has a summit of 225 m (738 ft) AOD. The site and surrounding downs are easily accessible by public footpath.

== See also ==
- List of hillforts in England
