= Stan Beckensall =

British rock art expert (1932–2025)

Stanley Beckensall
- Born: 17 August 1932
- Died: 1 October 2025 (aged 93)
- Education: Keele University
- Spouse: Jane (m. 1956)
- Children: Sonia, Sylvia, Julian, and Rachel

Stanley Gregory Beckensall MBE (17 August 1932 – 1 October 2025) was a British international rock art expert.

== Life and career ==
Beckensall was born on 17 August 1932. He was one of the first male graduates of Keele University. Beckensall was a Station Education Officer in the Royal Air Force, on National Service. He became head of English at Ifield Grammar School, Crawley New Town, Sussex. Beckensall was head of English in a large comprehensive school in Malta for two years. Afterwards, he moved to Northumberland to train teachers at Alnwick College of Education. He was later head teacher of two Northumberland schools, and was chairman of the Northumberland Teachers of Drama Association. Beckensall wrote and produced many plays for young people and adults, two of which were broadcast on BBC Radio Newcastle, though he remains most famous for his writings on Prehistoric Rock Art. He appeared on British television and in other British media many times, but his passion remained prehistoric rock art.

In May 2004, Beckensall was awarded an Honorary Doctorate from the University of Newcastle upon Tyne for his contribution to the study of British rock art. In 2005 on the UNESCO colloquium on world rock art, he represented Great Britain. In 2006, his website was awarded the Channel Four television ICT British Archaeological Award.

He was appointed a Member of the Order of the British Empire (MBE) in the 2019 New Year Honours for services to Prehistoric Rock Art and History in Britain.

Beckensall died on 1 October 2025, at the age of 93.

== List of published works ==
- The Prehistoric Carved Rocks of Northumberland (1974)
- Northumberland place-names (1975)
- Life and Death in Prehistoric Northumberland (1976)
- Northumberland's Prehistoric Rock Carvings (1983)
- Rock Carvings of Northern Britain (August 1986)
- Hexham, History Beneath Our Feet (1991)
- Prehistoric Motifs of Northumberland Vol. 1 (1991)
- Prehistoric Motifs of Northumberland Vol. 2 (1992)
- Cumbrian Prehistoric Rock Art (1992)
- The Spindelstone Dragon (*) (1993)
- Life and Death in the Prehistoric North (1994)
- Shepherds, Rogues and Angels (*) (1995)
- Prehistoric Rock Art of County Durham, Swaledale and Wensleydale (1998)
- Prehistoric Rock Art in Northumberland (Oct 2001)
- British Prehistoric Rock Art (Aug 2002)
- Prehistoric Rock Art in Cumbria (Jun 2002)
- Prehistoric Northumberland (Mar 2003)
- Northumberland, Shadows of the Past (Jul 2005)
- The Prehistoric Rock Art of Kilmartin (2005)
- Place Names and Field names of Northumberland (Feb 2006)
- Circles in Stone: a British Prehistoric Mystery (Oct 2006)
- Hexham, A History and Guide (2007)
- Northumberland from the air (2008)

Unquiet grave. A novel (2008) Powdene, Newcastle*

Northumberland's Hidden History (2009), Amberley
Prehistoric Rock Art in Britain (2009), Amberley
Northumberland Viewpoints (2010), Amberley
Empire Halts Here: Viewing the heart of Hadrian's Wall (2010), Amberley
Coastal castles of Northumberland (2011), Amberley
Hills and Valleys of Northumberland (2012), Amberley
Hexham Through Time (2012), Amberley
Northumberland Churches (2013), Amberley
Northumberland Prehistoric Rock Art 3rd printing (2014), The History Press
Forthcoming in 2014: Northumberland: a Celebration, Fonthill Media, Stroud
Pilgrimage: a tour of Northumberland in pictures and poems, Fonthill

(*) Non fiction writings; plays.
