= Bratton, Wiltshire =

Village in Wiltshire, England

Coordinates: 51.270°N 2.124°W

Bratton
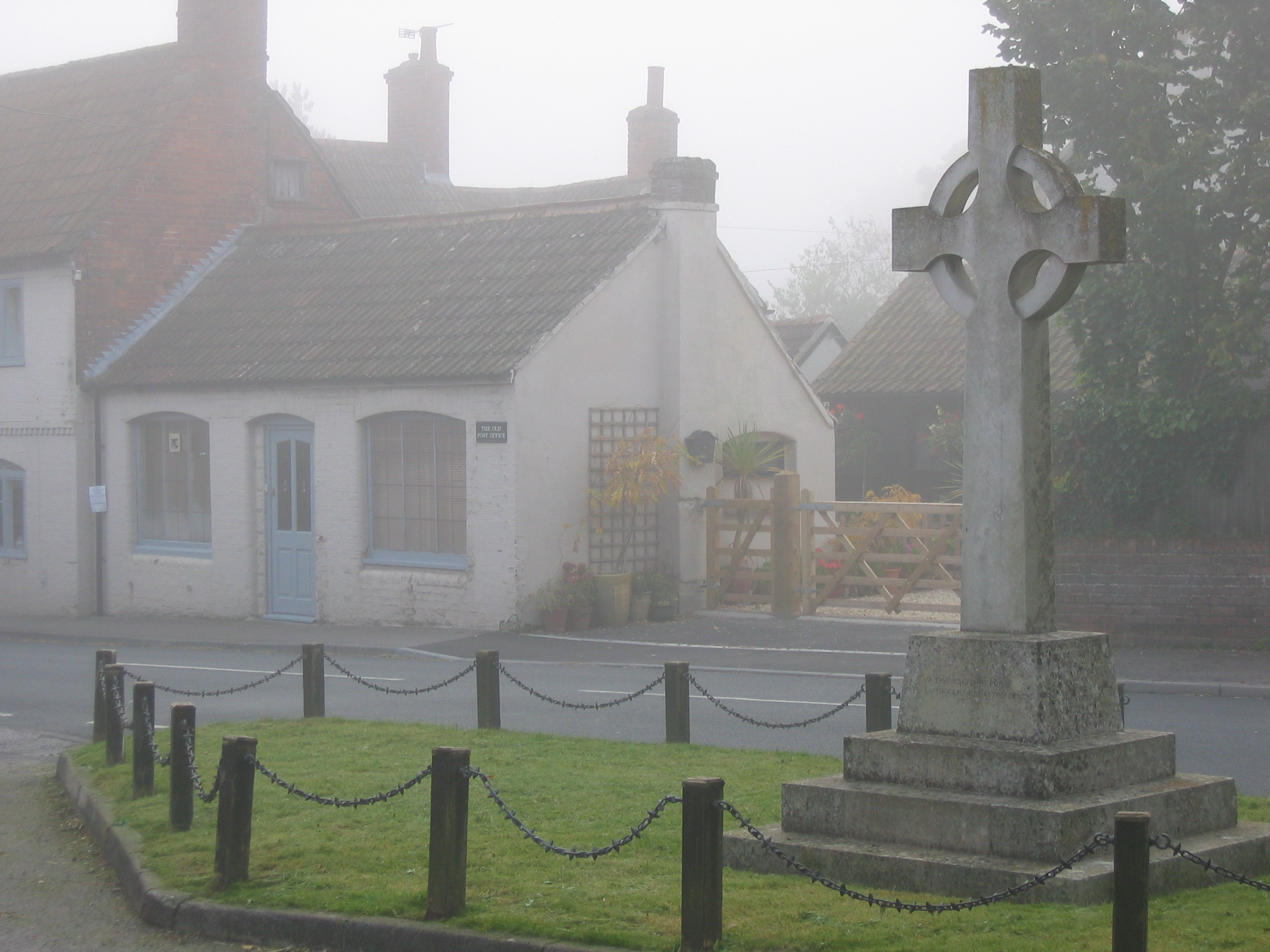
- War memorial, Bratton

- Location within Wiltshire
- Population: 1,171 (in 2021)
- OS grid reference: ST914523
- Unitary authority: Wiltshire
- Ceremonial county: Wiltshire
- Region: South West
- Country: England
- Sovereign state: United Kingdom
- Post town: WESTBURY
- Postcode district: BA13
- Dialling code: 01380
- Police: Wiltshire
- Fire: Dorset and Wiltshire
- Ambulance: South Western
- UK Parliament: South West Wiltshire
- Website: Parish Council

Bratton is a village and civil parish in the English county of Wiltshire, about 2.5 miles (4 km) east of Westbury. The village lies under the northern slope of Salisbury Plain, on the B3098 Westbury – Market Lavington road.

== History ==
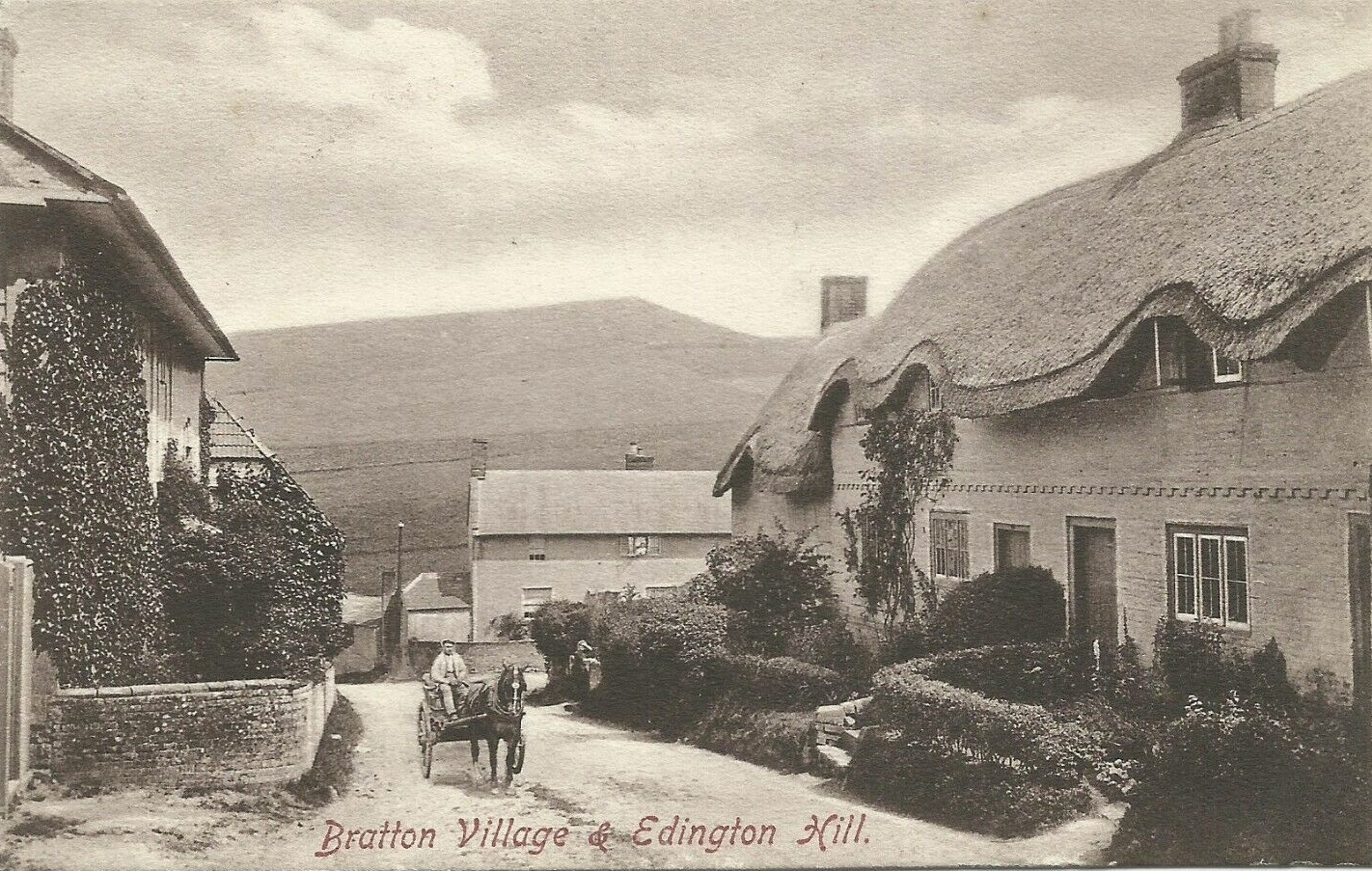
Melbourne Street, c. 1910

The massive earthworks of the Iron Age hill fort known as Bratton Castle (or Bratton Camp) are within the parish.

Bratton was a tithing of the ancient parish of Westbury until 1894, when it became a separate civil parish.

An agricultural machinery business, R & J Reeves & Son, had a central site in Bratton village which became known as Bratton Iron Works. Begun as a blacksmith in 1799, the company became nationally known in the 19th century and was the largest employer in the area. The firm closed in 1970 and the site is now the village play area.

The Stert and Westbury Railway was built across the parish in 1900. The local station was in the adjacent parish of Edington and was called Edington & Bratton; the station closed to passengers in 1952 and to goods in 1963, but the line remains open as part of the Reading to Taunton Line.

== Religious sites ==
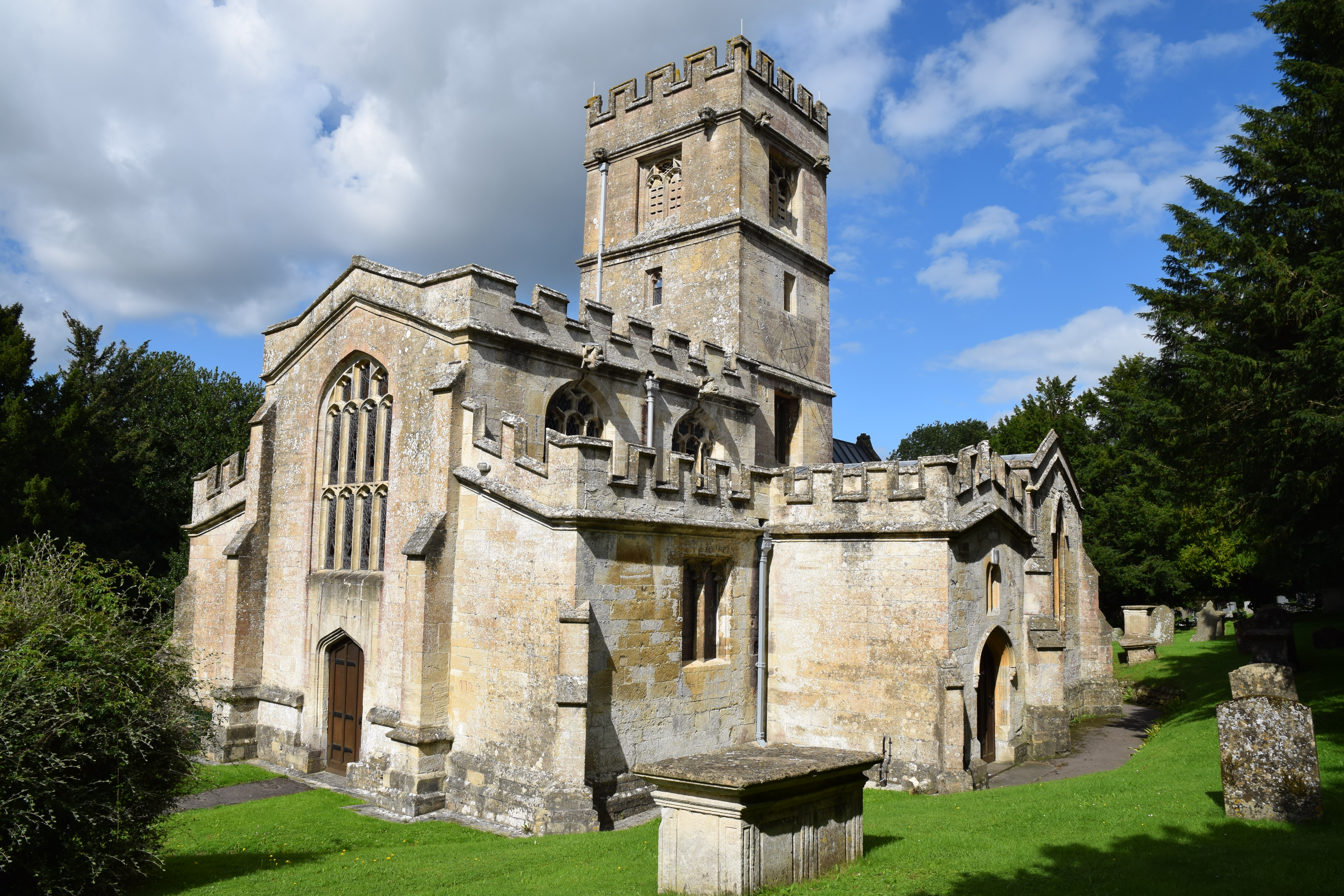
St James the Great

The Church of England parish church of St James the Great has 14th-century origins and may be on the site of an earlier church. It was rebuilt in the 15th century; the chancel was rebuilt in 1854 by G. G. Scott, with further restoration by T. H. Wyatt in 1860. The church is Grade II* listed.

A Baptist chapel was built in 1734, enlarged in the 1780s and again in the next century, with the addition of a schoolroom. Pevsner describes the chapel as "externally a gem" and it is Grade II* listed. As of 2018 the chapel is still in use.

A Methodist chapel was built in 1870 and closed in 1952; the building was demolished in 1957.

== Schools ==
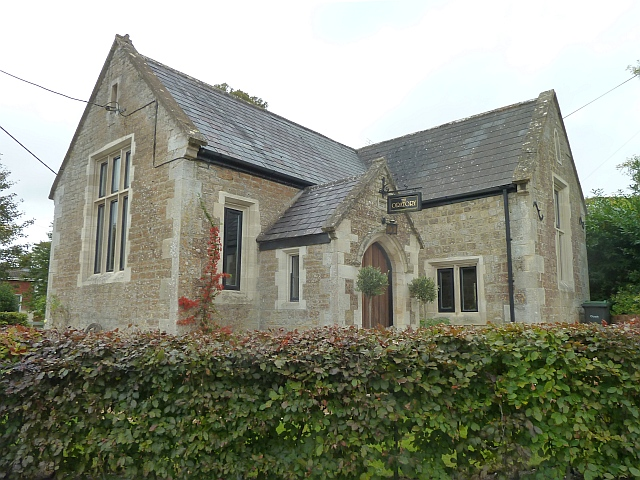
The Oratory, Bratton, formerly the National School

In 1846, a National School was built at the top of Batts Lane, Bratton, now called the Butts, and enlarged in 1877. Also around 1846, a British School was established, and the lessons taught included Arithmetic and Algebra, Geography, Grammar, Scripture, Reading, Ciphering, History, and Drill. This school, intended for the use of nonconformists, was in Stradbrook.

In 1928, both schools were closed and their pupils moved to a newly built Wiltshire County Council school, which became Bratton Primary School and was extended in 1982. The former British School became an ex-servicemen's club, while the National School building – known as The Oratory – continued in its role as a Sunday school and church hall, until it was sold for residential use in around 2009.

== Landmarks ==
In the village:

- A commemorative plaque, complete with industrial cog and brick wall, unveiled in 1993 for the R & J Reeves & Sons Iron Works.
- A war memorial in the form of a step-based wheel cross.

On Westbury Hill:

- The Battle of Ethandun Memorial – a large sarsen stone summounting a base of cemented pebbles, unveiled in 2000.
- The Queen Elizabeth II golden jubilee beacon placed in 2002.
- A topograph dating from 1968, showing towns and cities which can be seen from the hillside.
- Westbury White Horse – hill figure
- Bratton Castle – Iron Age hillfort

Roughly a mile west of Bratton is a former Lafarge Cement factory, which was reduced to a distribution site in 2009. The factory had a 400 feet (120 m) tall chimney, which was demolished in September 2016.

== Notable buildings ==
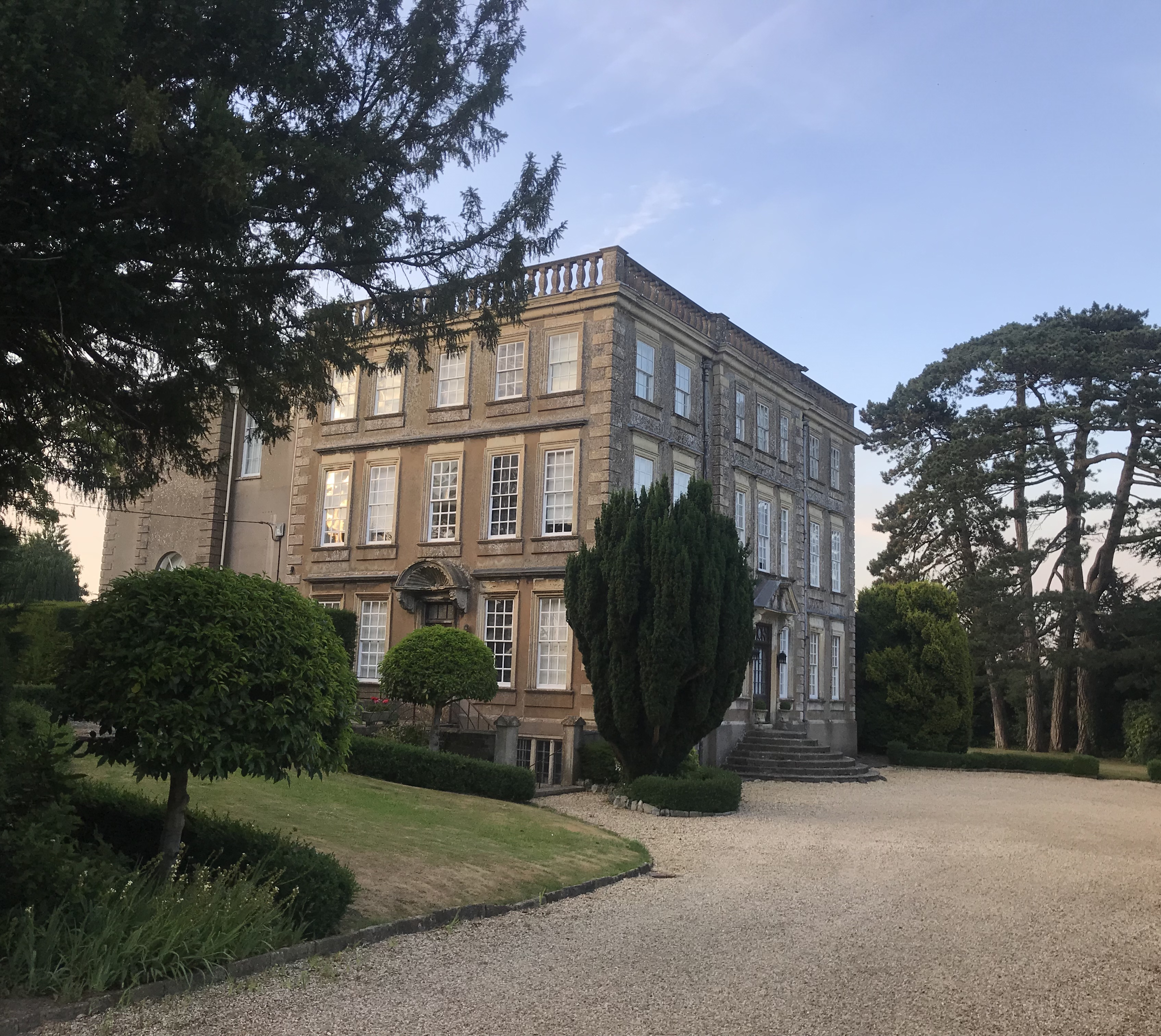
Bratton House

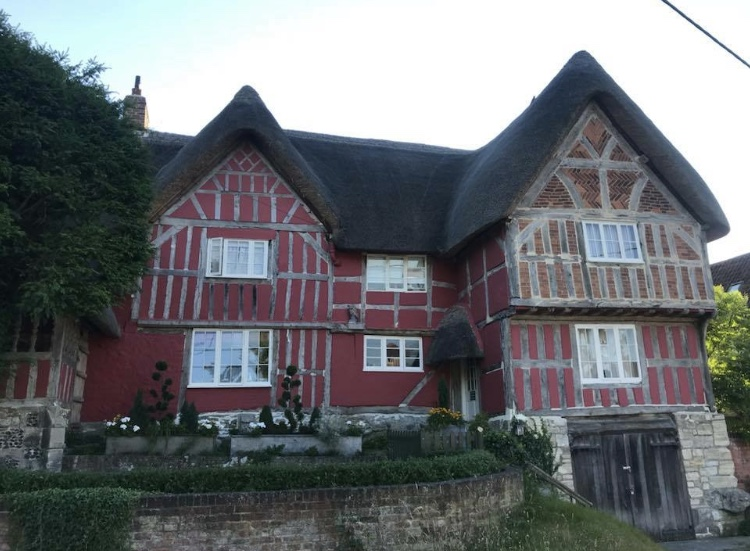
Court House, Bratton

The Court House (15th and 17th centuries) and Bratton House (1715 and 1826) are Grade II* listed.

The Old Mill on Lower Road is a converted medieval watermill and likely one of the oldest buildings in the village. It is now a residence but maintains milling machinery in the cellars

== Amenities ==
The village has a Post Office and village shop, a village hall and a pub, The Duke at Bratton.

Bratton Downs is a biological and geological Site of Special Scientific Interest.

== Notable residents ==
- Maria Grace Saffery (1773–1858), poet and Baptist hymn-writer, lived in Bratton.
- Rebecca Smith (1807–1849), last British woman to be executed for infanticide of her own child
- Rev. George Whitaker (1811–1882), clergyman and educator
- Sir Horace Seymour (1885–1978), British diplomat, Ambassador to China
- Admiral Sir Frank Twiss (1910–1994)
- Spencer Loch, 4th Baron Loch (1920–1991), succeeded Sir Horace Seymour at Bratton House
- Major General Sir Jeremy Moore (1928–2007), Commander of British land forces during the Falklands War, lived in the village for over 20 years until his death
- Jack Lauterwasser (1904–2003), cyclist, silver medal winner at the 1928 Olympics, Amsterdam
- Marjorie Reeves (1905–2003), historian and educationalist, author of Sheep Bell and Ploughshare: The Story of Two Village Families which describes village life
- Lieutenant General Louis Lillywhite (born 1948)

== See also ==
- Battle of Ethandun
