= Wibberley =

Wibberley may refer to:

- Brian Wibberley (1866–1944), Australian Methodist minister
- Cormac and Marianne Wibberley, American husband and wife screenwriting team known as The Wibberleys
- Gerald Wibberley (1915–1991), British agricultural economist
- Leonard Wibberley (1915–1983), Irish novelist— The Mouse that Roared
- Marcus Wibberley (born 1981), British organist
- Mary Wibberley (died 2013), English romantic fiction writer

== See also ==
- Wimberley, a town in Texas, U.S.
