= Shoreham Memorial Cross =

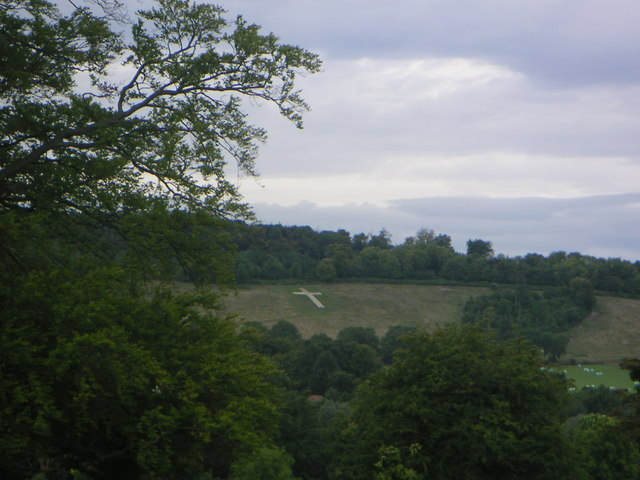

- Location within Kent
- 51°20′12″N 0°10′23″E
- Location: Shoreham, Kent, England

History
- Built: 1920; 106 years ago

Site notes
- Architectural style: Hill figure

Scheduled monument
- Official name: Shoreham Memorial Cross
- Designated: 21 October 2021
- Reference no.: 1474978

The Shoreham Memorial Cross is a Christian cross hill figure carved into a chalk escarpment above the village of Shoreham, Kent. The concept of the cross was the idea of a Shoreham man, Samuel Cheeseman, two of whose sons had been killed on active duty during the First World War. It was carved between May and September 1920 on land donated by Francis Mildmay who had also served in the war. In October 2021 Historic England designated the cross a scheduled monument.

== History ==
The village of Shoreham is located in the Shoreham Valley, an area of undulating and wooded escarpments depicted by the artist Samuel Palmer in the 1820s. In 1920 Samuel Cheesman, a local resident, determined to carve out a cross on the hillside to the west of the village, to commemorate two of his sons and the other forty-eight men of Shoreham who had been killed during the Great War. The site was donated by a local landowner, Francis Mildmay, who cut the first turf on Empire Day, 24 May 1920. The cross was complete by September 1920. (Note: Other sources give a completion date of September 2021.) On Remembrance Sunday Samuel Cheeseman would drag a small cannon to the cross and fire salvos to mark the beginning and the end of the Two-minute silence. In 1921 the official village war memorial was erected near the bridge over the River Darenth. The cross is referenced in the inscription on the war memorial, which reads; ‘SHOREHAM / KENT / REMEMBER / AS YOU LOOK / AT / THE CROSS / ON THE HILL / THOSE / WHO GAVE / THEIR LIVES / FOR / THEIR COUNTRY / 1914-1919’. By the early 21st century the sightline from the church to the cross had been blocked by trees, but the view was restored by felling in 2010.

== Description ==
The cross is cut from the chalk hillside and surrounded by an edging of carved chalk blocks. It is 30m long and 18m wide, the left hand bar being slightly longer than the right to correct the perspective when viewed from the village. In 2021 Historic England designated the cross a scheduled monument. Its listing record describes the cross as "an eloquent witness to the tragic impact of world events on this local community" and notes its near-unique status as a "very rare surviving example of a hillside memorial cross". (Note: Historic England records the only other known example of such a hillside cross as that in the nearby village of Lenham. The Lenham Cross is a Grade II listed structure.)

== See also ==
- Lenham Cross

== Sources ==
- Newman, John (2012). Kent: West and The Weald. The Buildings of England. Newhaven, US and London: Yale University Press. ISBN 978-0-300-18509-6. OCLC 875767298.
