= M. K. Ashby =

Mabel Kathleen Ashby (1892 – 1975) (wrote as M. K. Ashby) was an educationalist, writer and historian born in Tysoe, Warwickshire, England.

== Biography ==
=== Early life ===
She was one of the daughters of Joseph Ashby and his wife Hannah Ashby (Ashby also being her maiden name). Her brother Arthur Ashby was a pioneer of agricultural economics.

In 1907 Mabel won a scholarship to Warwick High School, where she became a weekly boarder. From there, she won a King’s scholarship to Birmingham University. This was a government grant conditional on undertaking to train as a teacher. She took a B.A. degree in her first three years, and stayed on to take an M.A. in philosophy. While she was at the training college, she successfully organised in her second year a women’s club for providing student amenities such as provision of common rooms and proper meals.

On leaving college she was appointed to a post as instructress of Rural Pupil Teachers in Staffordshire. This meant working in remote villages, travelling by train, bicycle or pony-and-trap, talking to teachers and giving lessons to small groups of receptive boys and girls.

After a summer term as a temporary lecturer at Bingley College in Yorkshire, in 1919 she became Warden of a Hall of Residence for teachers in training in Bristol University.

=== Middle years ===
In 1924 she answered what she regarded as a “call” to accept the post of Advisory Teacher to Rural Schools, a post created for her by Henry Morris, the famous director of Education in Cambridgeshire. After some years of this “lonely and strenuous” work (it involved frequent changes of location, and dealing with sometimes resentful head teachers), she fell ill and returned to her cottage in Shennington that she shared with her lifelong friend Margaret Philips. She spent the next year recuperating and writing The Country School: its Problems and Practice (probably the thesis she submitted for the M.Ed. degree which she was awarded by Manchester University in 1930).

She next accepted a temporary post as Education Lecturer at Salisbury Training College, and the following year she was accepted to a similar, but established, post at Goldsmiths College, London.

In 1933 she applied for and was appointed to the post of Principal of the Residential College for Working Women, usually known as Hillcroft from the name of its house at Surbiton. The college provided a year’s course of liberal education for women who had to leave school early, but who had since shown an interest in and capacity for further study.

=== Later life ===
She retired in 1946, but the next thirty years were filled with creative activity. She began to travel, some of her accounts of which were later published in Countrywoman's Occasions. She later moved, with Margaret Philips, to a farmhouse in Bledington, near Stow on the Wold. It was here that she wrote Joseph Ashby of Tysoe, which was published in 1961. It was awarded the James Tait Black Memorial Prize for biography in that year. However, the accolade which she perhaps most appreciated was the tribute paid by E. P. Thompson, the Marxist historian of the English working class. He so admired the book that he made a point of seeking the acquaintance of the author, and paid several visits to Bledington. Her next literary venture was to write a history of Bledington, 'The Changing English Village.

She was successively President of the Women's Institute and Chairman of the Parish Council at Bledington. She died 16 October 1975 in an Oxford nursing home.

== Key works ==
- Joseph Ashby of Tysoe. Cambridge University Press, 1961; reissued by Merlin Press, London, 1974
- Countrywoman's Occasions
- The Country School: its problems and practice
- The Changing English Village
