= Marlborough White Horse =

Hill figure near Marlborough, Wiltshire, England

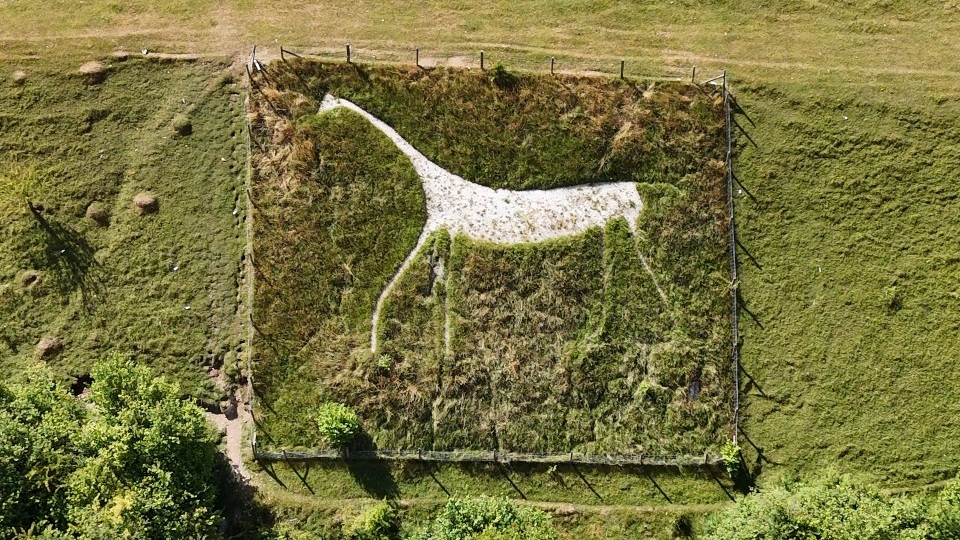
- The horse in 2025

- Location in Wiltshire
- 51°24′46″N 1°44′15″W
- Type: Hill figure monument
- Location: Marlborough, Wiltshire, England

History
- Built: 1804

Site notes
- Material: Chalk
- Height: 14 metres (46 ft)
- Length: 19 metres (62 ft)

Marlborough White Horse, also called the Preshute White Horse, is a hill figure on Granham Hill, a fairly shallow slope of the downland above the hamlet of Preshute, southwest of Marlborough in the county of Wiltshire, England. Dating from 1804, it is one of several such white horses in Great Britain, and one of eight in Wiltshire.

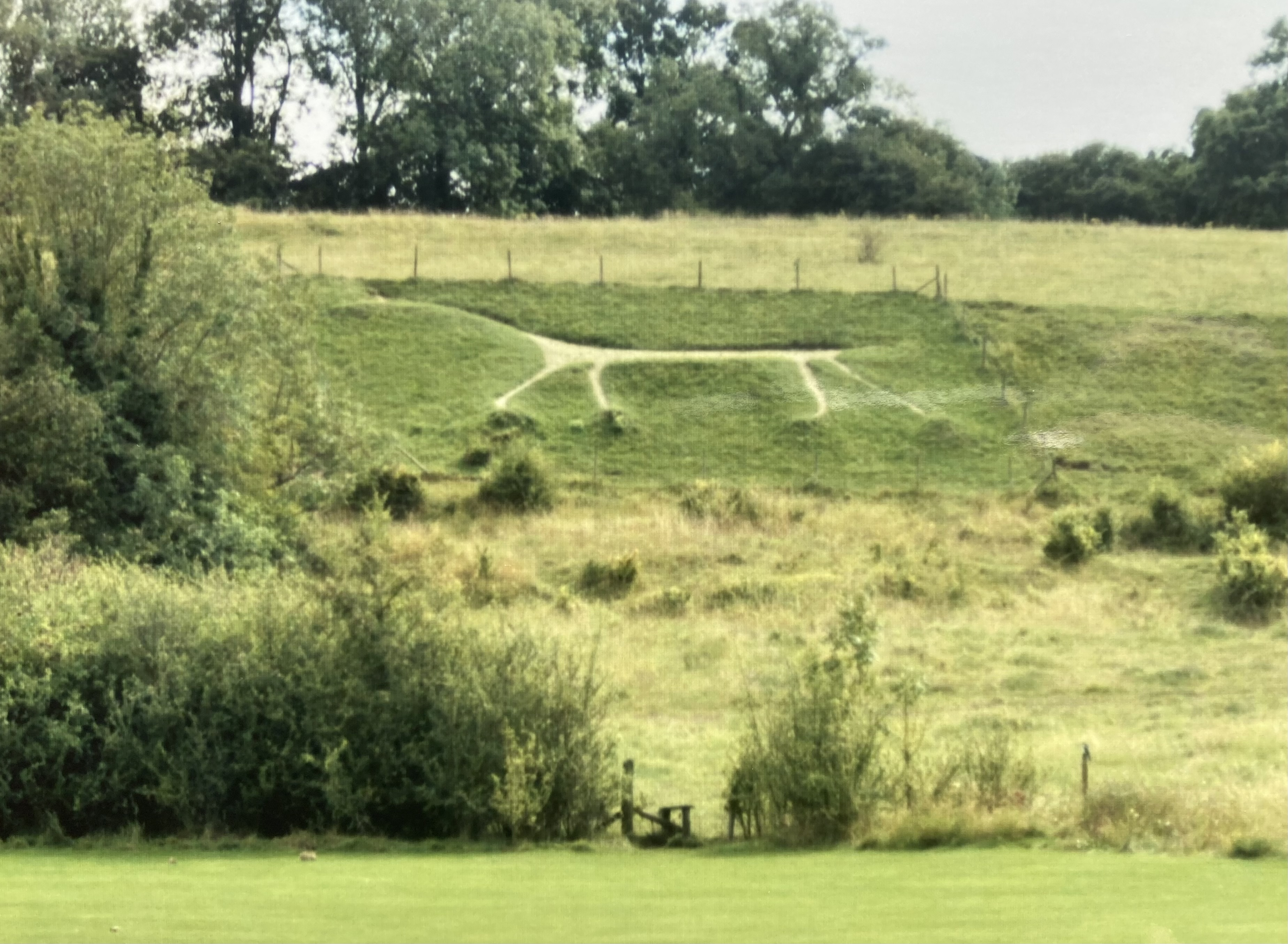
Marlborough White Horse in 2012

Many distant views of the horse are obstructed by trees, but it can be seen from parts of the town of Marlborough. One good view is from a footpath running from Preshute House to the A345 road. The figure lies some 500 metres south of Marlborough College, within 100 metres of the southeast corner of the college sports ground.

== History ==
The smallest (in terms of width) such horse in Wiltshire, the Marlborough horse was cut in 1804 by boys at Mr Greasley's Academy, also called the High Street Academy, a school in Marlborough High Street which occupied the building now known as The Ivy House Hotel. This was not the present-day Marlborough College, which is only a short distance away. The horse was designed and marked out on the hill by a boy called William Canning, whose family owned the Manor House at Ogbourne St George. From then onwards, it was "scoured", or cleaned, every year, this becoming a tradition at the school marked by revelry.

Greasley died about 1830, and the school was closed, leading to the horse being neglected for some years. By 1860, however, it was back in good condition and can be seen in a photograph taken that year at a cricket match. In 1873, Captain Reed, an old boy of Greasley's Academy who had taken part in the horse's creation, oversaw a new scouring.

The horse is 62 feet (19 m) long by 47 feet (14 m) high, and it has become thinner since the early twentieth century. It was restored again in September 2001, when it was re-chalked with pure chalk mixed with water and applied with a stiff brush, but by the late summer of 2002 grass had already begun to grow over much of its surface.

A verse of the Marlborough College school song refers to the horse:

And when to Marlborough old and worn we shall creep back like ghosts,
And see youngsters yet unborn run in between the posts,
Ah, then we'll cry, thank God, my lads, the Kennett's running still,
And see, the old White Horse still pads up there on Granham Hill.

For a time in 1969, the horse was not the only hill figure in Marlborough, as the Scout logo was cut into a nearby hill to commemorate the Marlborough Group's Diamond Jubilee. As no permission was granted for the figure to be permanent, the land's owners replanted it later that year.

== Inspiration ==
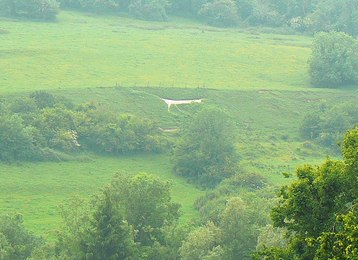
Aerial view of Marlborough White Horse in 2007

The horse may have been inspired by the nearby Cherhill White Horse, which itself was probably created in imitation of the first such Wiltshire horse, at Westbury, remodelled in the 1770s. It is unclear whether the Westbury horse is ancient, but the Uffington horse, now in Oxfordshire, has been shown to date from the Bronze Age. The earliest evidence of the Westbury horse appears in a paper by the Rev. Francis Wise published in 1742.

== See also ==
- Hill figure
- List of hill figures in Wiltshire
- Cherhill White Horse
- Westbury White Horse
- Litlington White Horse

== Bibliography ==
- William Plenderleath, On the White Horses of Wiltshire and Its Neighbourhood (Wilts Archaeological Magazine, vol. 14 for the year 1872, pp. 12–30)
- Rev. W. C. Plenderleath, White Horses of the West of England (London: Alfred Russell Smith, & Calne: Alfred Heath, 1885; 2nd edition, London, Allen & Storr, 1892)
- Morris Marples, White Horses & Other Hill Figures (London: Country Life Ltd, 1949; New York, Charles Scribner's Sons, 1949)
- Kate Bergamar, Discovering Hill Figures (London: Shire Publications, 1968, 4th revised edition 1997, ISBN 0-7478-0345-5)
- David Clensy, Walking the White Horses: Wiltshire's White Horse Trail on Foot (2023)
