= White Horse at Ebbsfleet =

Former planned colossal statue in Kent, England

The White Horse at Ebbsfleet
- Concept image of the White Horse in its planned location near an electricity pylon
- Interactive map of The White Horse at Ebbsfleet
- Location: Springhead, Ebbsfleet Valley, Kent, England
- Coordinates: 51.430°N 0.327°E
- Designer: Mark Wallinger
- Type: Colossal equine statue
- Material: steel frame, concrete skin
- Length: 56 metres (184 ft)
- Height: 50 metres (160 ft)

The White Horse at Ebbsfleet, formerly the Ebbsfleet Landmark, colloquially the Angel of the South, was a planned white horse statue to be built in the Ebbsfleet Valley within the Ebbsfleet Garden City area in Kent, England. Designed by Mark Wallinger to faithfully resemble a thoroughbred horse, but at 33 times life size, the colossal sculpture was to be 50 metres (160 ft) high.

Taller than the Angel of the North in Gateshead and Dream in St Helens, as a highly visible piece of public art, it was intended to highlight the Ebbsfleet redevelopment area and the Ebbsfleet International railway station in particular. It would have been visible from both the A2 road and High Speed 1 railway line, which cross each other nearby.

After a design competition was launched in 2007, Wallinger's vision of a white horse was selected in 2008 by a panel of representatives from each of the three founding patrons/developers of the Ebbsfleet Landmark Project Ltd (ELP Ltd) — London & Continental Railways, Land Securities and Eurostar — and four other art advisors appointed to the panel by ELP Ltd. Planning permission for the structure was granted by Gravesham Council on 15 April 2010.

Though originally estimated at £2 million, costs increased to £12–£15 million according to Ben Ruse, a spokesman for the project based at London & Continental Railways offices in London and failed to be raised.

The project was intended to be privately funded. As of February 2008, in excess of £1 million had been committed to the project by the founding patrons (of ELP Ltd) from London & Continental Railways who are "actively promoting the development of regeneration opportunities in Ebbsfleet", Land Securities "the UK's leading Real Estate Investment Trust" and from Eurostar.

The project stalled for lack of funding in 2012 and ELP Ltd closed down on 19 April 2016.

== Background ==
Prior to any design being announced, the sculpture was planned as a counterpart to Antony Gormley's Angel of the North in Gateshead (with a stipulation that it be at least twice as wide and high, and visible from 20 miles away), and to mark one of six main "gateways" to London, hence the informal name Angel of the South being adopted early on for the formally named Ebbsfleet Landmark Project Ltd.

== Design ==
The sculpture was planned to be made from concrete laid over a steel primary and secondary inner frame and supported by 25 metres (82 ft) deep concrete foundations. At 33 times life size, it would have measured 50 metres (160 ft) vertically from the ground to the tip of the ears, 40 metres (130 ft) to the top of the back, and 56 metres (184 ft) horizontally, from nose to tail. It was intended to be "a faithfully accurate representation of a thoroughbred racehorse in all but scale".

== Location ==
Planned to be located at Springhead near Springhead Road, Northfleet, in a site designated as the proposed "linear park", the sculpture was intended to highlight the Ebbsfleet Valley regeneration area, and Ebbsfleet International railway station in particular, in a similar manner to the Angel of the North in Gateshead and Dream in St Helens.

From this location, it would have been visible from both road traffic on the A2 road, and from the High Speed 1 railway line; used by both Eurostar international services and Southeastern high speed services.

== History ==
=== Design shortlisting ===
Gormley and other artists were invited to admit designs on 22 May 2007, by which time the intended site (a hill outside the new High Speed 1 station at Ebbsfleet International, near Land Securities' Springhead Park residential development) had been announced. A shortlist was chosen on 28 January 2008 (comprising Mark Wallinger, Rachel Whiteread, Richard Deacon, Christopher le Brun, and Daniel Buren). The artists were given three months from then to produce their proposals, which were displayed to the public from May 2008 at Bluewater Shopping Centre. Le Brun produced a winged disc; Buren a tower of 5 cubes; Deacon a stack of 26 different steel polyhedra; Wallinger a realistic sculpture of a horse and Whiteread a plaster cast of a house's interior atop an artificially-created mountain. In September 2008 the shortlist was reduced to three designs: Deacon's, Buren's and Wallinger's. The competition triggered public interest, and was the subject of a satirical series of cartoons in Steve Bell's If... series between 4 and 8 February 2008, and in May 2008. Locally it has been the subject of apathy or even hostility.

=== White Horse figure selected ===
On 10 February 2009 the BBC announced that the winner was Wallinger's realistic sculpture of a horse. The statue was modelled on one of Wallinger's own racehorses Red Riviera; which coincidentally won the 16:20 race at Lingfield Park Racecourse on the same day that the artist's sculpture won the competition.

The sculpture's completion was originally planned to occur before domestic high-speed services to Kent began on the Channel Tunnel Rail Link in 2009 and in time for the 2012 Olympics.

=== Planning permission granted ===
A planning application was submitted to Gravesham Borough Council's planning committee in January 2010, who voted unanimously to grant planning permission for the structure on 14 April 2010 despite opposition from local residents. The planning permission expired in April 2013, an application for renewal was submitted.

== White horse of Kent ==
The White horse of Kent is a prancing white horse is an ancient symbol of Kent, and appears on the Flag of Kent. White horse hill figures are a common feature of England as a whole. The proposed statue has been referred to as both the White Horse of Ebbsfleet and the White Horse of Kent

The white horse of Kent is typically depicted as prancing (or rampant in heraldry), rearing up on its hind legs and is also referred to as Invicta, the (motto of Kent). Kent County Council initially criticised the original design for not prancing like Invicta and proposed an alternative, but the entry was rejected by the competition's panel of representatives.

== See also ==
- Folkestone White Horse
- Angel of the North
- Star of Caledonia
