= Vale of Red Horse =

Rural district in Warwickshire, England

Coordinates: 52.124129°N 1.529377°W

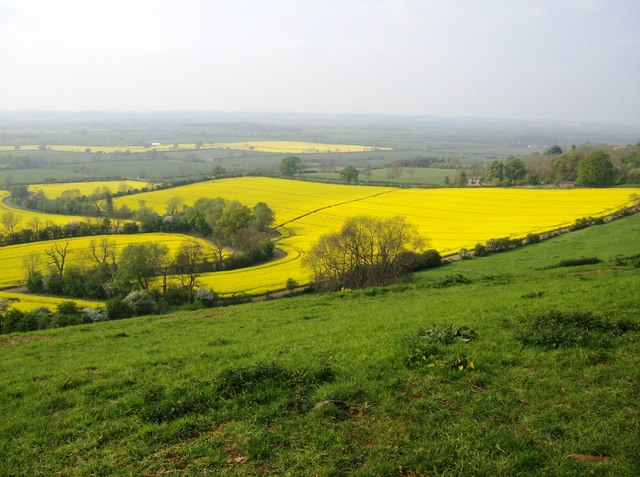
View over the Vale of Red Horse, from Spring Hill near Edge Hill village

The Vale of Red Horse, also called the Vale of the Red Horse or Red Horse Vale, is a rural district in southern Warwickshire, England, lying between the escarpment of Edgehill and the northern Cotswolds around the valley of the Stour. Early gazetteers noted the Vale as a rich corn-growing area, and it is still relatively sparsely populated: its main settlements are Kineton and Shipston-on-Stour. The Fosse Way runs through the area and the Battle of Edgehill was fought on its fringes in October 1642.

The 17th century Warwickshire poet Michael Drayton devoted a long section of his topographical poem Poly-Olbion to what he called the "Vale of Red-horse", noting it was in length "near thirty miles" and deploring its obscurity compared to the better-known Vales of White Horse and Aylesbury.

The Vale takes its name from the Red Horse of Tysoe, a hill figure once cut into the red clay near the village of Tysoe. The Red Horse was first recorded in 1607, and in its earliest form was nearly 100 yards long. Various dates have been suggested for the figure's creation, ranging from the Anglo-Saxon period to the 15th century. It was lost by the First World War.

The Vale of Red Horse has given its name to an electoral ward of Stratford-upon-Avon and an electoral division of Warwickshire. The modern ward boundaries, which include the villages of Tysoe, Oxhill, Whatcote, Pillerton Priors, Pillerton Hersey and Butlers Marston are smaller than the historic area of the Vale, which was considered to include all the low-lying ground separating the north Cotswolds from Edgehill.

== See also ==
- Vale of White Horse
