= Lenham Cross =

War memorial in Lenham, Kent, England

Coordinates: 51.2424°N 0.7291°E

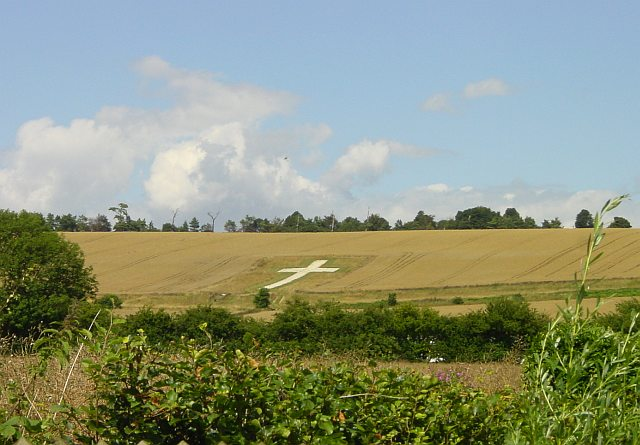
Lenham Cross

The Lenham Cross is a chalk cross carved into the hillside to the north of Lenham in Kent, in England.

The Latin cross is 200 ft (61 m) high with arms 70 ft (21 m) wide. It was designed by Mr C H Groom, the headmaster of the village school, as a First World War memorial. It was created in a field on the south-facing slopes of the North Downs, close to the Pilgrim's Way, by volunteers from the village, and unveiled in September 1922 (102 years ago) by Major General Sir Arthur Lynden-Bell, who had served as an officer with the Buffs (East Kent Regiment) in the Second Boer War and on the general staff in the First World War.

The cross was filled in during the Second World War to prevent it being used as a navigation aid by the German Luftwaffe. It became a Grade II listed building in 2017.

A dedicatory stone of rough-hewn granite was sited in an enclosure with steps and railings at the south end of the cross, beside the Pilgrim's Way, with a smooth face inscribed by the names of 42 men of the parish who were killed during the First World War. A smaller stone listing 14 more names was added after the Second World War. The memorial stone was moved in 1960 to stand beside St Mary's Church, Lenham, about 1 km (0.62 mi) south west of its original location. A bench and plaque were added to the original memorial enclosure in 1977, donated by the Ashford branch of the Royal Electrical and Mechanical Engineers Association.

== See also ==
- Shoreham Memorial Cross
