= Folkestone White Horse =

White horse hill figure, carved in 2003 into Cheriton Hill, Kent, South East England

Coordinates: 51.101208°N 1.139708°E

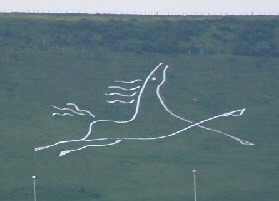
The Folkestone White Horse

The Folkestone White Horse is a white horse hill figure, carved into Cheriton Hill, Folkestone, Kent, South East England. It overlooks the English terminal of the Channel Tunnel and was completed in June 2003.

The horse was planned as a Millennium Landmark to help regenerate the Folkestone area. The design for the horse was drawn by a local artist, Charlie Newington, inspired by a nearby Iron Age fort in an area known as Horse Hill dating from three millennia ago and also based on the White Horse of Uffington. It is the first official hill figure in the town, although an area of chalk on Summerhouse Hill is said to resemble an elephant's head and has become known as the Folkestone Elephant.

Planning permission for the project was first applied for in April 1998, with an illustrative canvas mockup being erected in August 1999. The project was opposed by the Government watchdog English Nature due to the site's importance as a Site of Special Scientific Interest. In 2000 English Nature appealed to Deputy Prime Minister John Prescott, although the project was said to have widespread public support by local MP and prominent politician Michael Howard. The project was supported by Folkestone & Hythe District Council, who adopted it as their corporate logo. Due to the opposition, the project went to a public enquiry in 2001. The project was given the go-ahead in March 2002 by Stephen Byers, then Secretary of State for Transport, Local Government and the Regions, who stated that the emotional and symbolic value of the project outweighed the possible environmental damage.

== Construction ==
Construction of the horse began in September 2002. The work to build the horse was completed entirely by hand. Directed from afar by the artist via radio, a team of volunteers staked out a second canvas template of the horse, and following this, shallow trenches were then dug into the topsoil, 12–24 inches (30–60 cm) wide. These trenches were then filled with limestone slabs. The entire figure is approximately 90 metres long, measured from the front to the rear hoof.

Both the Green Party and Friends of the Earth appealed to the European Union to stop the project based on the site's protection under the European Habitats Directive. In early May 2003 the EU issued a formal notice to the UK Government declaring the work illegal, and giving the government two months to either explain the 2001 enquiry decision satisfactorily, or restore the site, by which time the turf for the horse had already been cut and transplanted.

Over two weeks in May 2003 a team of volunteers including locally based Gurkha soldiers transported, cut and positioned limestone slabs in the trenches, fixing them in place with pins. The limestone laying phase of the construction, which had been delayed when the Gurkhas were needed to crew fire engines during the 2002–2003 Firemen's strike, was completed in early June 2003, with the formal notice from the EU outstanding.

In June 2004 "The Friends of the Folkestone White Horse" was formed, to promote the landmark and look after the site, which requires periodic light weeding. A time capsule was buried on the site on 18 June 2004.

== See also ==
- Hill figures of England
- The White Horse at Ebbsfleet, a standing white horse sculpture planned for Ebbsfleet, Kent
- White horse of Kent, the prancing white horse symbol of Kent
- Litlington White Horse
