= Gerald Wibberley =

British agricultural economist (1915–1993)

Gerald Percy Wibberley, CBE (15 April 1915 – 8 November 1993) was a British agricultural economist.

== Early life and education ==
Born on 15 April 1915 in Abergavenny, the son of Percy Wibberley, Gerald Percy Wibberley was educated at the town's King Henry VIII Grammar School. He attended the University College of Wales, Aberystwyth, graduating with a first class degree in agriculture; heavily influenced by Arthur Ashby, Wibberley went on to complete a master's degree at the Agricultural Economics Research Institute at Oxford. He then completed his PhD at Illinois University.

== Career ==
=== Government work ===
In 1940, Wibberley took up a year-long post as an assistant lecturer at the University of Manchester. Alongside work in the Home Guard, from 1941 to 1943, he was District Officer (and then Assistant Executive Officer, 1943–44) for the East Sussex Agricultural Committee, tasked with maximising food production to meet wartime requirements. For five years from 1944 to 1949, Wibberley was an Assistant Rural Land Utilisation Officer with the Ministry of Agriculture, and subsequently a Research Officer in Land Use; he developed interpretations of the use of rural land which "became a challenge to the conventional orthodox of farming first", but became frustrated with the bureaucracy of the ministry.

=== Academia ===
Between 1954 and 1969, he was head of the Department of Economics at Wye College. He was also Reader in Agricultural Economics there from 1958 to 1962, and Professor of Rural Economy between 1963 and 1969. He compiled controversial but influential works, including Agriculture and Urban Growth (1959), which advocated for non-farming uses of land. In 1969, he became the Ernest Cook Professor of Countryside Planning, jointly based at University College, London, and Wye College. He left that post in 1982. The same year Bradford University conferred upon him an honorary Doctor of Science degree. He was appointed a Fellow of Wye College three years later. Wibberley was President of the British Agricultural Economics Society (1975–76) and a Member of the Nature Conservancy Council (1973–80). He was called upon to give expert advice on many policy and planning programmes which touched upon his interests, including plans to build a third airport for London and to build and expand the new town of Milton Keynes.

According to The Independent, "the teaching and research undertaken in his department embraced not only the traditional subjects of agricultural policy and farm business management, but also the conservation and socio-economics of the countryside and agrarian development in the Third World. It stated, "Though quintessentially an academic," Wibberley "was a man of compassion ... his studies tended to focus on problems of rural deprivation – as they affected farm and rural workers and rural youth. He gave much thought to the problems of creating rural employment and to the adverse impact of second homes on village life and economy."

He was appointed a Commander of the Order of the British Empire in 1972. He was a capable public speaker and a lover of music. He married twice; firstly, in 1943, to Helen Yeomans, who died in 1963; and secondly, in 1972, to Peggy Samways. He died on 8 November 1993, having had a daughter with his first wife.
