= Red Horse of Tysoe =

Hill figure in England

Coordinates: 52.101192°N 1.483886°W

The Red Horse of Tysoe was a hill figure in the parish of Tysoe, South Warwickshire, England, cut into the red clay below the escarpment of Edgehill. It gave its name to the surrounding area, which is still known as the Vale of Red Horse or Red Horse Vale. The figure was first recorded in 1607, and in its earliest form was nearly 100 yards long. Various dates have been suggested for its creation, ranging from the Anglo-Saxon period to the 15th century.

It was recut several times over the next two centuries in widely differing forms and locations, giving a total of at least five different horse figures in the Vale. The last Red Horse was finally covered over around 1910 or 1914.

== History of the Red Horse ==
Although the cartographer John Speed refers to Red Horse Vale in 1606, the first clear mention of the Red Horse of Tysoe occurs in the 1607 edition of William Camden's Britannia. Camden wrote:

a great part of the very Vale is thereupon termed the Vale of Red Horse, of the shape of a horse cut out in a red hill by the country people, hard by Pillerton.

A second mention of the Red Horse was made in 1612 by the Warwickshire poet Michael Drayton, while another more explicit account was given by antiquary William Dugdale, who was given the task of recording features of interest around the country in case the Parliamentarians should seek to destroy them. In his Antiquities of Warwickshire Illustrated (1656), he wrote:

Within the precinct of the Mannour of Tishoe now belonging to the Earl of Northampton [...] there is cut upon the side of Edgehill the proportion of a Horse in a very large forme; which by reason of the ruddy colour of the earth is called the Red Horse, and giveth denomination to that fruitful and pleasant country thereabouts, commonly called the Vale of the Red Horse: the trenches of which ground where the shape of the said Horse is so cut out, being yearly scoured by a Freeholder in this Lordship, who holds certain lands there by that service.

Dugdale added that the figure was located "in the Red Horse ground, opposite the east window of Tysoe church".

Whenever it was first cut, it appears that this first horse (called the "Great Horse" by its later researchers Carrdus and Miller) did not survive long after the 1650s. Later soil surveys clearly indicated a second, smaller horse (the "Foal") overlapping and adjacent to the "Great Horse", possibly identifiable with a figure seen by Celia Fiennes some thirty years after Dugdale: "a red horse cut on some of the hills about [the Vale], and the Earth all looking red the horse lookes so as that of the white horse vale". It has also been suggested that the "Foal" and the larger horse were a group of figures representing a mare and her foal.

== Subsequent horses ==
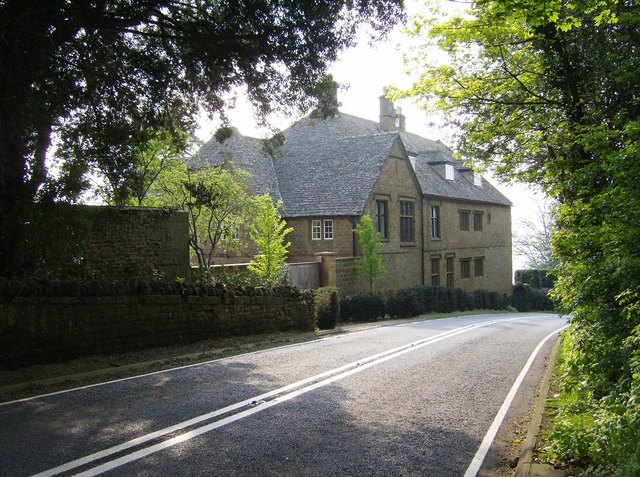
The former Sun Rising coaching inn, on the Edgehill escarpment. Its landlord, a Mr Nicholls, had the original site on Red Horse Ground ploughed up subsequent to the Tysoe Inclosure Act 1796 (36 Geo. 3. c. 31 Pr.), but later arranged for another, smaller figure to be cut on a different site.

A third, substantially smaller figure, facing in the opposite direction (South) to the earlier horses, was extant in the 18th century, when there was much discussion of the figure by local antiquarians. Reverend Francis Wise put forward a theory, based on local tradition, that the horse had been scoured annually on Palm Sunday to commemorate Richard Neville, 16th Earl of Warwick's participation in the Battle of Towton, while a Reverend William Asplin ridiculed Wise for his theories on this (and other) hill-figures. This incarnation of the horse was both confirmed on contemporary maps and in 1772 measured fairly exactly by Richard Gough, who described it (in an 1806 reference) as "croup to chest, 34 feet; shoulder to ears, under jaw to bottom of chest, 10 feet; shoulder to ground, 16 feet or 57 hands; length of off foreleg, 12 feet; length of near foreleg, 9 feet; hindlegs, 10 feet; belly, 19.5 feet; sheath, 8 feet; tail (more like a lion's), 18 feet; width of each leg 1 foot; diameter of the eye, 1 foot 2 inches long". It was acknowledged at the time that this was much smaller than the earlier "colossal" horse.

The third Red Horse was eventually destroyed when a Mr Simon Nicholls, the landlord of nearby inn the Sun Rising, had it ploughed up around the time of the enclosures. However, Nicholls found that the ending of the annual fair or wake associated with the 'scouring' of the Red Horse affected his takings, and subsequently arranged for a fourth horse, even smaller, to be cut near Sunrising Covert around the beginning of the 19th century.

Nicholls' Horse, which was regarded as having no antiquarian interest, had vanished by 1910. A possible fifth Red Horse was cut on Spring Hill, some distance from the original site, subsequent to the cutting of the fourth, but this final version had disappeared sometime shortly after 1914, although some elderly residents interviewed in the 1960s claimed to remember having seen it.

== Archaeological evidence ==
Evidence for the earlier horses was uncovered in the 1960s by local historians K. A. Carrdus and G. W. Miller using a combination of aerial and other photographs, historical research, fieldwork and soil resistivity surveys; some of their findings were published as The Red Horse of Tysoe in 1965. In particular, they located the site of the first and largest Red Horse (along with the second and third) on a hillside called "the Hangings" – referred to as "Red Horse Hill" on an enclosure map – using aerial photographs to confirm the original figure to have been a galloping horse around 285 feet (87 m) long and 95 feet (29 m) high. Further excavations in 1968 confirmed the figure's outline and the presence of a red clay infill.

The site of the Red Horse was planted with trees in the late 1960s.
