= Long Man of Wilmington =

Hill figure on Windover Hill near Wilmington, East Sussex, England

- Wilmington Giant
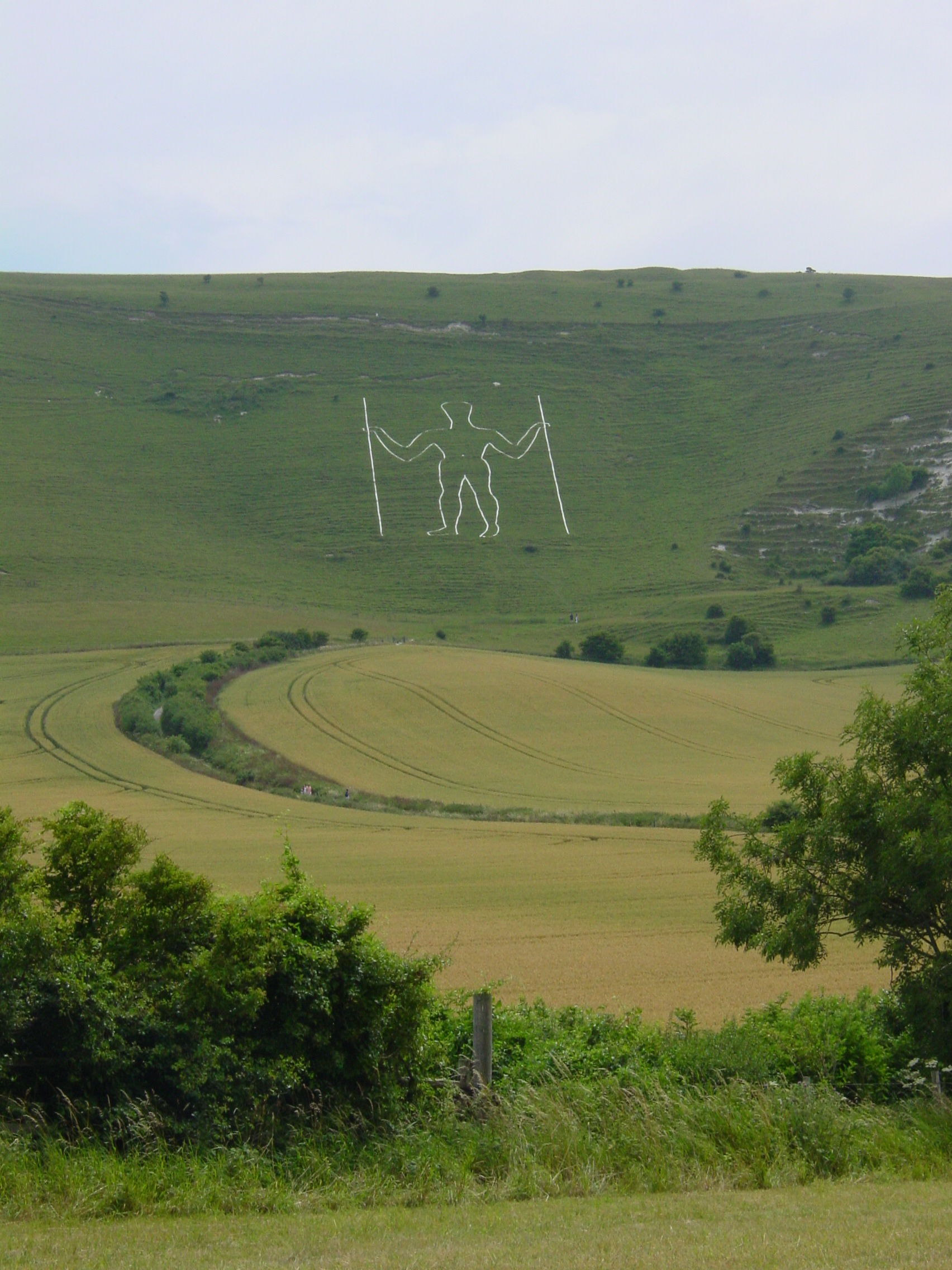
- The Long Man of Wilmington

- Location within East Sussex
- 50.810°N 0.188°E
- Type: Hill figure monument
- Associated with: Litlington White Horse
- Location: Windover Hill, Wilmington, East Sussex, England

History
- Built: First recorded 1710

Site notes
- Material: Chalk
- Length: 72 m (236 ft)
- Owner: Sussex Archaeological Society
- Public access: Yes

Identifiers
- NHLE: 1002293

Scheduled monument
- Designated: 1 May 1951

The Long Man of Wilmington or Wilmington Giant is a hill figure on the steep slopes of Windover Hill near Wilmington, East Sussex, England. It is 6 miles (9.7 km) northwest of Eastbourne and 1/3 mile (540 m) south of Wilmington. Locally, the figure was once often called the Green Man. The Long Man is 235 feet (72 m) tall, holds two "staves", and is designed to look in proportion when viewed from below.

Formerly thought to originate in the Iron Age or even the Neolithic period, a 2003 archaeological investigation showed that the figure may have been cut in the Early Modern era – the 16th or 17th century AD. From afar the figure appears to have been carved from the underlying chalk, but the modern figure is formed from white-painted breeze blocks and lime mortar.

The Long Man is one of two major extant human hill figures in England; the other is the Cerne Abbas Giant, north of Dorchester. Both are scheduled monuments. Two other hill figures that include humans are the Osmington White Horse and the Fovant regimental badges.

The Long Man is one of two hill figures in East Sussex; the other is the Litlington White Horse, three miles south-west of the Long Man.

== Origins ==
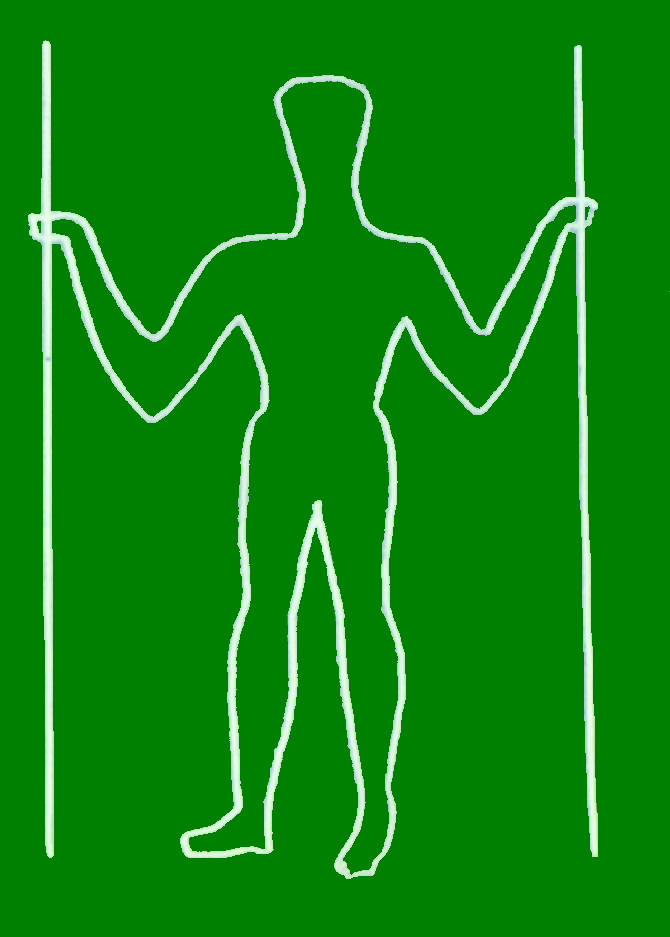
Artist's impression

The origin of the Long Man is unclear. For many years the earliest known record was a drawing made by William Burrell when he visited Wilmington Priory, near Windover (or Wind-door) Hill, in 1766. Burrell's drawing shows a figure holding a rake and a scythe, both shorter than the present staves. In 1993, another drawing was discovered in the Devonshire Collections at Chatsworth House which had been made by the surveyor John Rowley in 1710, the earliest date the figure is known to have existed.

An early suggestion, sometimes stated to be a local tradition, was that the Long Man had been cut by monks from nearby Wilmington Priory, and represented a pilgrim. This was not widely believed by antiquarians, who felt that monks were unlikely to have created an unclothed figure. Until the first decade of the 21st century, the Long Man was most commonly asserted to have been cut in the Neolithic period, primarily due to the presence of a long barrow nearby, or given an Iron Age attribution based on a perceived similarity to other hill figures.

John North wrote that during the centuries around 3480 BC the figure would have been positioned to mark the constellation Orion's movement across the ridge above it. The figure, according to this interpretation, may have been a manifestation of a Neolithic astral religion. Another suggestion was that the figure had a Romano-British provenance, while an origin in the time of Anglo-Saxon England gained credence after the 1964 discovery at Finglesham in Kent of an Anglo-Saxon buckle depicting a figure, possibly Odin, holding two spears in a similar fashion to the Long Man.

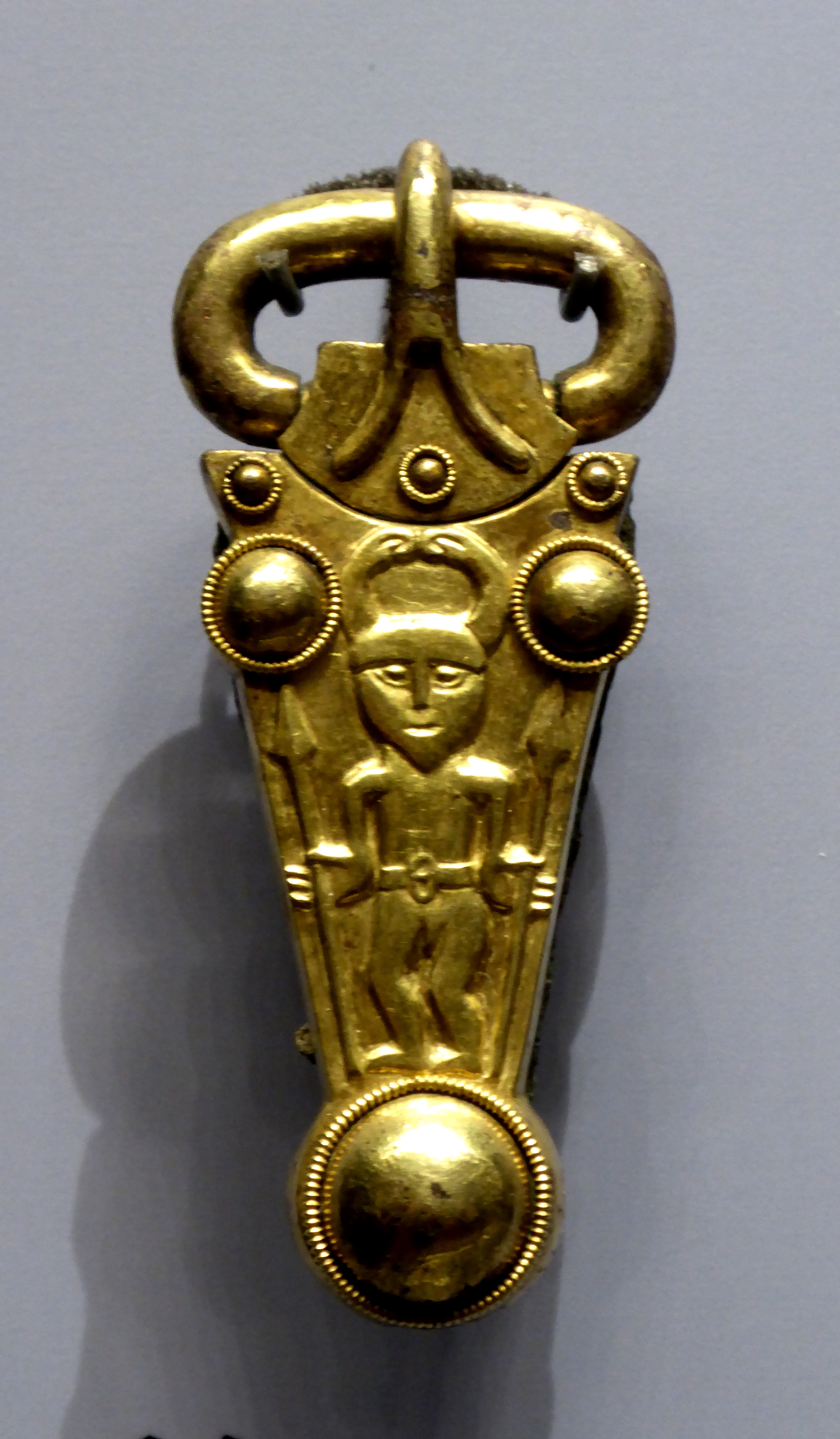
The buckle discovered during excavations led by Sonia Chadwick Hawkes at Finglesham Anglo-Saxon cemetery in 1964

In her book Weald of Kent and Sussex (published in 1953) novelist and regional historian Sheila Kaye-Smith puts forward the theory: "that he represents the god Baldur standing at the gate of Midsummer. On Midsummer Day the rising sun, appearing over the eastern rim of Andredsweald, would send a patch of light across the waves of trees to enter, as it were, the hillside beyond them. In that hillside the ancients saw a gate, the gate of midsummer and morning, and they saw a god opening the gate to the triumphantly entering sun. So where he stood they carved his likeness, a hand on each pillar of the gate. To us now he looks as if, instead of this, he were holding an upright pole in either hand."

Archaeological work performed in 2003 by Martin Bell of the University of Reading, in association with Aubrey Manning's Open University programme Landscape Mysteries, strongly suggested that the figure dates from the Early Modern period – the 16th or 17th century AD. Bell found that the slope on which the Long Man was cut had gone through a period of instability in this time, after a very long prior period of stability, suggesting that the figure was first cut then. This has opened up the possibility that the Long Man could be a Tudor or Stuart-era political satire in the manner recently posited for the Cerne Abbas giant, or possibly a religious image associated with the Reformation. The academic Ronald Hutton noted that "we can at least celebrate the fact that we have our first, apparently unequivocally, Early Modern hill figure, and historians now have to reckon with it".

== Pre-20th-century history ==
Whatever the figure's origin, for much of its history it seems to have existed only as a shadow or indentation in the grass, visible after a light fall of snow or as a different shade of green in summer: it is described or illustrated as such in 1710, 1781, 1800, 1835 and 1851. Indeed, the figure was once known locally as the "Green Man". Earlier depictions, such as those of Rowley and Burrell, show other details such as a possible scythe blade on the right-hand staff and the suggestion of a helmet or hat on the figure's head: they also indicate a different, albeit indistinct, position for the feet. The current outline of the Long Man is largely the result of a 'restoration' of 1873–74, when a group led by the vicar of Glynde, Reverend William de St Croix, marked out the outline with yellow bricks whitewashed and cemented together, though it has been claimed that the restoration process distorted the position of the feet.

The archaeologist John S. Phené, who was co-opted into the project and whose 1873 talk to the Royal Institute of British Architects had originally inspired it, initially expressed his reservations with both the bricking and the design used. The original intention of the 'restoration' had been to cut the figure down to the chalk bedrock, but had been abandoned after trials showed that the soil depth made this too difficult.

In the years after the 'restoration' several people familiar with the figure commented that the feet were altered, having originally both pointed outwards and downwards so that "the Giant appeared to be coming down the hill", in the words of Ann Downs, who had grown up at Wilmington Priory in the 1840s. Resistivity surveys conducted in the 1990s by R. Castleden, combined with examination of apparent shadow marks shown in early photographs, have provided strong evidence that the feet had in fact pointed outwards as described by 19th century observers and had been slightly lower than in the current outline. The surveys showed that the figure had likely been originally cut by trenching, in the same manner as other chalk hill figures, but had been abandoned after only a few scourings.

There was also some evidence to suggest that the feature on one staff similar to a scythe blade, flail or shepherd's crook was genuine, along with a suggestion of a "helmet" or hat. It seems likely that the proportions of the figure have been distorted slightly by the 1873 bricking and the 1969 replacement of the bricks with breeze blocks, with the Long Man having been up to 75.5 metres (248 ft) tall prior to 1873.

== 20th and 21st centuries ==
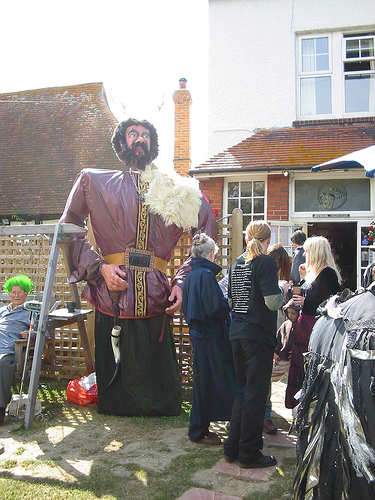
Annual pagan Long Man celebrations (with effigy)

In 1925, the site of the Long Man was given to the Sussex Archaeological Trust (now the Sussex Archaeological Society) by the Duke of Devonshire. During the Second World War it was painted green to avoid it being used as a landmark by German aircraft.

The 1993 book, The Druid Way by Sussex author Philip Carr-Gomm, drew attention to the supposed significance of the Long Man as a sacred site for the modern world.

At dawn on May Day, the Long Man Morris Men dance at the foot of the Long Man. The Long Man plays host to neo-pagan rituals on Sundays closest to the eight Pagan Festivals through the year.

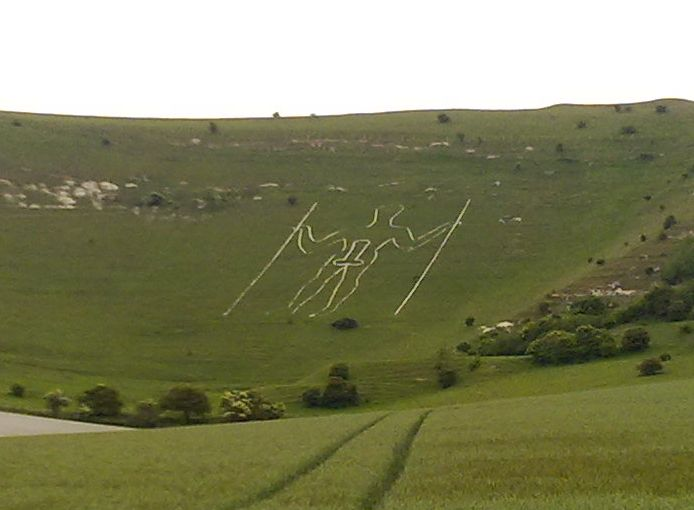
The vandalised "Long" Man of Wilmington during summer solstice 2010

In 2007, the site was used in television fashion show Trinny & Susannah Undress the Nation. Trinny Woodall, Susannah Constantine and 100 women gave the Long Man a temporary female form by using their bodies to add pigtails, breasts and hips. The women created the effect by lying down in white boiler suits to make shapes. ITV were given permission for the event by Sussex Archaeological Society and that they took "the utmost care ... to protect this historical site". The hillside chalk carving was not permanently changed or affected. However the scene prompted twenty-two Neo-Pagans to protest at the site during filming. The Long Man is claimed as 'sacred' by the Council of British Druid Orders, who said the 'stunt' would "dishonour an ancient Pagan site of worship". The owners, Sussex Archaeological Society, later apologised for offence caused to any "individuals or groups" by the filming.

Overnight, on 17/18 June 2010 a giant phallus was painted on the Long Man, rivalling that of the Cerne Abbas Giant. It appeared that a football pitch marker or similar object was used to paint the phallus. On 16 October 2015, anti-fracking protesters added the words "FRACK OFF!" above the Long Man, in protest against fracking being approved in the area. The words were removed quickly and were believed to have been made out of tarpaulin. On 27 January 2021, during the COVID-19 pandemic, a face mask was painted on to the Long Man.

== Influence on culture ==
The Wilmington Giant, Eric Ravilious, 1939

The Long Man has long been an influence on artists, musicians, and authors. The composers Benjamin Britten and Frank Bridge would often picnic at the foot of the figure, and the figure was an inspiration for artist Eric Ravilious (notably his watercolour The Wilmington Giant).

In Arthur Beckett's 1909 The Spirit of the Downs, a chapter, "The Hero on the Hill", is dedicated to the Long Man of Wilmington, and gives a fictional account of the invading Saxons' victory over the Britons, who celebrate by drawing an enormous figure on the Downs.

In 1989, Paul Geerts wrote a Suske and Wiske story named De krachtige krans (translated into English as The circle of power), in which the Long Man plays an important role as the protagonist's helper.

The figure inspired On Windover Hill by Nathan James, which premiered at Boxgrove Priory, near Chichester, by the Royal Philharmonic Concert Orchestra and Harlequin Chamber Choir on 7 March 2020. The figure was also an influence on Avril Coleridge-Taylor's work for chorus and orchestra, Wyndore, which was written in Alfriston in 1936.

In Season 2, Episode 3 of the Netflix dramatisation The Sandman the Long Man (named Wendel) is shown as a sort of gatekeeper to an interdimensional portal through which beings from Faerie (most notably King and Queen Auberon and Titania, Nuala, Cluracan, and Puck) enter the regular world of William Shakespeare on Lord Morpheus' invitation. This reflects the story told in "A Midsummer Night's Dream", #19 of the original comic-book series The Sandman, written by Neil Gaiman, that inspired Netflix dramatisation, drawn by Charles Vess and coloured for the first time by computer colouring pioneer Steve Oliff.

== See also ==
- Firle Corn
- Cerne Abbas Giant
- Hill figure
- Litlington White Horse
- Osmington White Horse
- Uffington White Horse
- Marree Man
- Fovant Badges
