= Firle Beacon =

Hill in England

Coordinates: 50°50′N 0°06′E

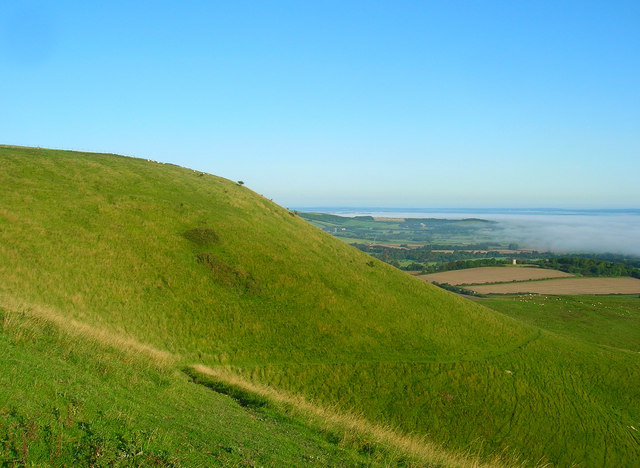
Looking north-west from the escarpment at Firle Beacon

Firle Beacon is a hill in the South Downs of southern England. It is 217 metres high and is a Marilyn. It commands a far-reaching view. When the prevailing wind is northerly, the site is often used for gliding activities like slope soaring.

== Barrows ==
In the area of Firle Beacon is a Neolithic long barrow and several round barrows. Round barrows generally date from the early Bronze Age.

At Firle Beacon itself (grid reference TQ 485 059) is a bowl barrow, about 60 feet (18 m) in diameter and 3.5 feet (1.1 m) high. It was opened in 1820; finds included two cremation urns.

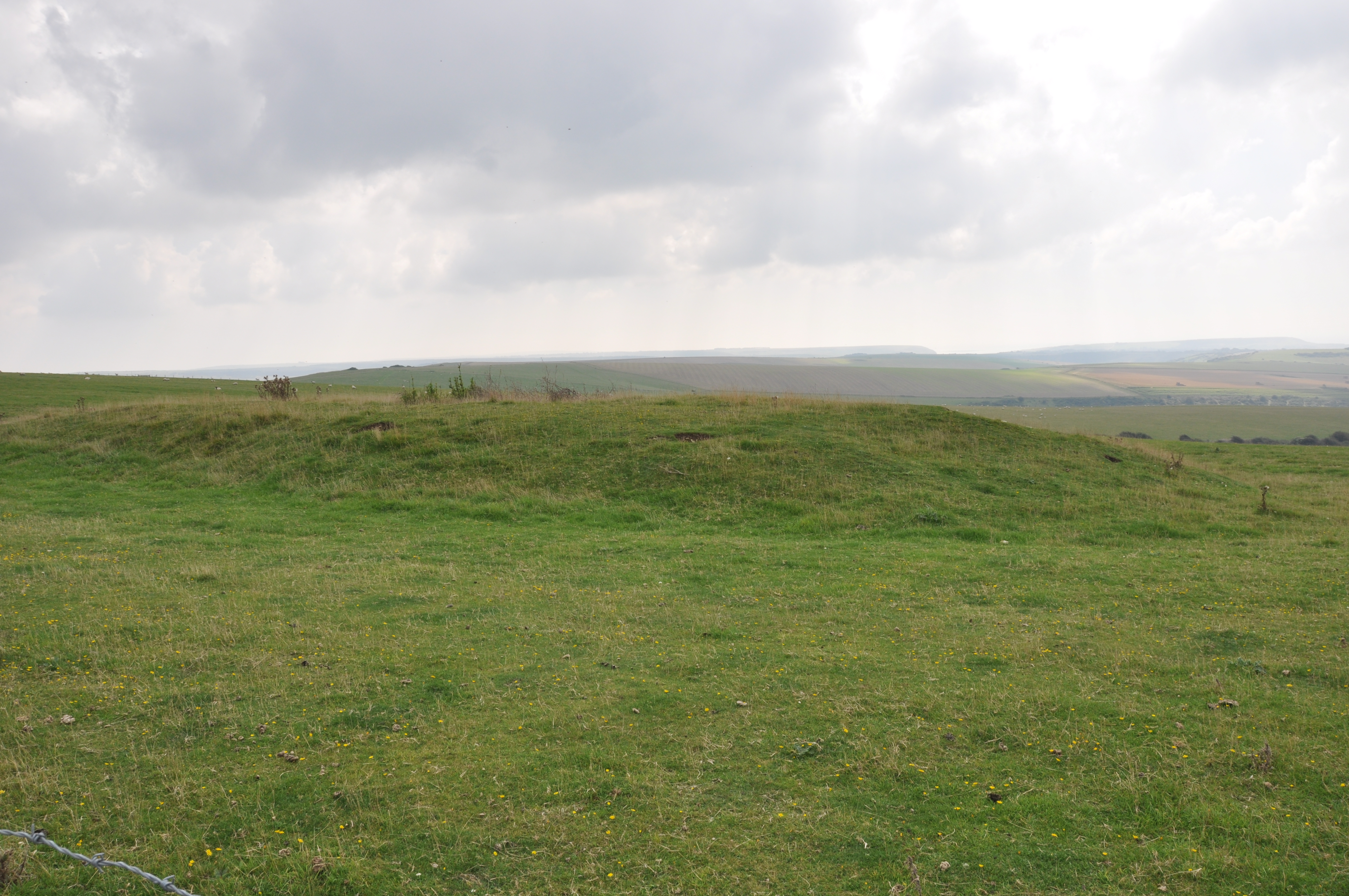
The long barrow near Firle Beacon

The long barrow, 220m west of Firle Beacon (grid reference TQ 483 058), is about 112 feet (34 m) long, 70 feet (21 m) wide and 8.5 feet (2.6 m) high. It has an east–west orientation, and has a surrounding ditch, more noticeable on the northern side.

There are other round barrows within a kilometre of Firle Beacon, to the west and east.

== Firle Corn ==
Firle Corn, high on the north-east slope of Firle Beacon, is a nearly lost hill figure, possibly gigantotomy, seen using infrared photography. It looks like a small ear of corn, but what it depicts is unknown. Legend suggests a giant called Gill was cut on this hill and considered an adversary of the nearby Long Man of Wilmington; one story says the Firle Beacon giant threw his hammer at the Wilmington giant and killed him, and the hill figure marks this site.

== See also ==
- Firle Escarpment
