= Joseph Ashby =

Joseph Ashby

Joseph Ashby (13 June 1859–4 March 1919) was an agricultural trade unionist born in Tysoe, Warwickshire, England. “His life was remarkable, encapsulating in many aspects the ideal of the self-improving working man, and embracing most of the institutions—the nonconformist chapel, trades unionism, and working-class Liberalism—that so clearly represented social and political betterment in the later years of the nineteenth century.” (Quotation from Alun Howkins, Oxford Dictionary of National Biography). His biography was written by his daughter, Kathleen Ashby.

== Biography ==
Joseph was born 13 June 1859, an illegitimate son of Elizabeth Ashby, an unmarried servant. Kathleen Ashby describes Joseph's father as from “A family of very high rank, great landowners of in Warwickshire and neighbouring counties ... with some, though not great, achievement in science and letters". (Her notes deposited at the Warwickshire CRO suggest the family was the Comptons, Marquesses of Northampton, whom indeed Joseph had contacts with throughout his life.)

Joseph left school when nearly eleven and worked on a farm in Tysoe before being employed in quarrying in nearby Hornton. Later he worked as a builder at Compton Wynyates; it was while here that he first came into contact with William Compton, 5th Marquess of Northampton.

Elizabeth brought up Joseph as an Anglican; in his teens and against her wishes he joined the Methodists. Joseph attended one of the meetings of the farm workers union leader Joseph Arch. Although only a boy, he decided to join the union when he could. Also at this time, he came into contact with the third great influence of his life, the friendly society movement which gave him a belief in self-help.

By his late teens, he had found work with the Ordnance Survey, carrying instruments and taking simple measurements with a firm of surveyors in the Tysoe area; it was while working with the survey that he met Bolton King, the educationalist and sociologist, who was at that time a young Oxford graduate. King had found his vocation in social reform. Through his association with King and his contacts with local Liberalism Joseph began writing on the problems of rural life. He also collaborated with King on a survey of local villages. The methods employed were later used by the Ministry of Agriculture for its survey of farm labour conditions during the First World War. Writing for the local press remained a source of income for the rest of Joseph's life. His areas of interest included allotments, small-holdings, and the reform of land ownership. Extracts from his articles from the Warwickshire Advertiser were later published as Joseph Ashby's Victorian Warwickshire.

Joseph married his cousin Hannah Ashby in 1885: they had two sons of whom one was Arthur Ashby, agricultural economist, and five daughters.

In 1880s Joseph made contact again with Lord William Compton; Lord William was at the time residing at Castle Ashby in Northamptonshire, and Joseph working nearby. Joseph had “stood in the road, waylaying his carriage. He met with recognition and welcome; an interview was arranged”. He persuaded Lord William (now a Liberal MP) to let a farm to the Tysoe Allotments Association for division into allotments and small-holdings, himself becoming one of the first tenants.

From 1886 until 1910 he was an active and important figure in Warwickshire Liberalism, and from 1883 to 1906 he acted as Liberal agent for the southern part of the Rugby constituency. He spent the summer of 1893 as a traveling lecturer in one of the English Land Restoration League's “red vans”, arguing for allotments, small-holdings, and the restoration of the land to the people through land nationalization.

By the 1890s, Joseph's various activities brought him a number of suggestions for gaining work outside Tysoe. Earl Compton (Lord William Compton until 1887) wrote offering to find him a place on the Northampton estates. Later the Earl was to contact Joseph again, asking him to be a Liberal candidate for the parliamentary division of Stratford.

With a legacy from Hannah's aunt, the family were able to move, in 1895, into Church Cottage, Tysoe. In 1900, they moved into the Orchards, a little farmstead in Lower Tysoe. In the 1900s he became a parish and district councillor and a justice of the peace. Early in 1914 Joseph's scattered 100 acres (400,000 m^{2}) in Tysoe were exchanged for a 200-acre (0.81 km^{2}) holding, Coldstone Farm, at Ascott under Wychwood in Oxfordshire, where he died on 4 March 1919, aged 59.

== Writings ==
Joseph Ashby wrote a number of contributions to newspapers (the majority to the Warwickshire Advertiser) (M. K. Ashby gives some details in her preface, 1960).

== Sources ==
- Ashby, M. K. (1961) Joseph Ashby of Tysoe, 1859-1919: a study of English village life. Cambridge: Cambridge University Press
  - It was awarded the James Tait Black Memorial Prize for biography in that year. However, the accolade most gratifying to the author was the tribute paid by E. P. Thompson, the Marxist historian of the English working class. He so admired the book that he made a point of seeking her acquaintance, and paid several visits to Bledington.
- Howkins, Alun (2004) "Ashby, Joseph (1859-1919)", Oxford Dictionary of National Biography, Oxford University Press,
- Langley, Anne (2007) Joseph Ashby's Victorian Warwickshire.
- Warwickshire County Record Office, Ashby papers CR2500, CR2783
