= Arthur Ashby =

English agricultural economist

Arthur Wilfred Ashby, CBE (19 August 1886 – 9 September 1953) was a British agricultural economist.

== Early life ==
Arthur Wilfred Ashby was born on 19 August 1886, the eldest son of Joseph Ashby (1859–1919), a farmer and surveyor, and his wife Hannah (née Ashby; born c. 1861). The son of an unmarried servant, the elder Ashby spent his life working in agriculture in Tysoe, Warwickshire, eventually farming over 200 acres of land. His colourful life involved active participation in politics; he campaigned for the reform of land-ownership and smallholdings. As one biographer said "His life was remarkable, encapsulating in many aspects the ideal of the self-improving working man, and embracing most of the institutions—the nonconformist chapel, trades unionism, and working-class Liberalism—that so clearly represented social and political betterment in the later years of the nineteenth century".

== Career ==
=== Education ===
Like his father, the younger Ashby attended the National School in Tysoe, but left just before he turned 12 to work with his father to help him farm, survey the land and carry out his religious and political activities. In 1909 he enrolled at Ruskin College, Oxford, as a Charles Buxton Scholar and, after two years of study, left with a diploma in economics and political science. In 1912, he received a scholarship from the Board of Agriculture and attended the Institute for Research in Agricultural Economics at Oxford and then the University of Wisconsin as an honorary fellow in political science.

=== Academic ===
In 1917, Ashby completed his first book, Allotments and Smallholdings in Oxfordshire; the fruit of two years' work at the Institute in Oxford, it became a standard work in his field. Shortly afterwards, he worked for the Board of Agriculture until 1919, taking a major role in the establishment of the Agricultural Wages Board. After returning to the Institute once more, he was appointed head of the Department of Agricultural Economics at the University College of Wales, Aberystwyth, in 1924; professorship there followed five years later, which meant he became he first chair of agricultural economics in Great Britain. He returned to the Institute in Oxford, this time as its director, in 1946, serving until 1952; in the year of his appointment, he was also made a Commander of the Order of the British Empire and the following year became a fellow of Lincoln College, Oxford.

Ashby's work made him a pioneer of agricultural economics and he championed the establishment of the Agricultural Economics Society in 1926; he went on to be its president from 1934 to 1935 and from 1952 to 1953. He was a Member of Council of Agriculture for England (1920–46; chairman, 1939–40) and of Wales (1927–46; chairman 1944–45). He was also a founder of the International Conference of Agricultural Economics and its vice-chairman from 1949 to 1952. He contributed to a wide range of academic journals and gave important speeches at conferences relating to his field. He was an expert on milk-production and was instrumental in the establishment of the Milk Marketing Board, while also serving from 1924 on the Agricultural Wages Board. He was a passionate educator and a capable departmental leader.

== Personal life, local service and death ==
In 1922, Ashby married Rhoda, daughter of John Dean and Rhoda Bland, and they had one son. Never quite at ease with other academics, Ashby has been described as a "shy, reserved person with a touch of the suspicious caution of the typical countryman", but also as a helpful tutor with a good sense of humour. He inherited a radicalism from his father which manifested itself in support for the Labour Party, while his local commitments included service as a Justice of the Peace successively in Cardiganshire (1940–46) and Oxfordshire (1946–53). He died in Oxford on 9 September 1953 aged 67.

== Bibliography ==
Ashby authored or co-authored the following works:

- "One Hundred Years of Poor Law Administration" in Oxford Studies in Social and Legal History, ed. P. Vinogradoff (1912)
- Allotments and Small Holdings in Oxfordshire (1917)
- (with P. G. Byles) Rural Education (1923)
- (with I. L. Evans) The Agriculture of Wales (1944)

A partial list of his contributions to journal articles is in Journal of Agricultural Economics, vol. 12 (1956).

== Likenesses ==
Arthur Wilfred Ashby, three quarter-plate glass negatives and one bromide print, all by Elliot and Fry; held in the Photographic Collection at the National Portrait Gallery, London (NPGx86192, x99080, x99081, x99082)
