= Morris Marples =

English writer and schoolmaster (1901–1976)

Morris Marples (13 June 1901 – 9 November 1976) was an English author and schoolmaster. The headmaster of two grammar schools, he wrote important reference works on the history of football and on hill figures.

== Early life ==
Born in June 1901 in Huddersfield, in the West Riding of Yorkshire, Marples was the son of George Marples and his wife Anne Harrison, and was baptized at the Independent Chapel at Edgerton, Huddersfield, in November 1901. In 1911, the family was living at Hessle, in the East Riding. His father was a schoolmaster who taught art, and also "a man who cut figures in the chalk downs of England." The young Marples was educated at St Bees School and Exeter College, Oxford, captaining the rugby union teams at both. At Oxford he graduated BA in Literae humaniores, later promoted to MA.

He had a younger brother, Brian John Marples, who followed him to Exeter College and became a zoologist.

== Career ==
After Oxford, Marples followed in his father's footsteps and became a schoolmaster. His first headship was at Bideford Grammar School, from September 1931. From there, in December 1936, he was appointed as headmaster of Wolstanton County Grammar School, Wolstanton, Stoke-on-Trent. He stayed in post until he retired in July 1961.

== Work ==
Marples's Public School Slang (1940) was followed by his University Slang (1950), an "enquiry into the byways of university language", with a focus on Oxford and Cambridge.

George Marples had made detailed surveys of almost all of England's hill figures, and among his other work he had designed the Pewsey White Horse in 1937. He died in December 1939, and from the large body of notes his father left behind Marples compiled White Horses and Other Figures, published by Country Life in May 1949. A Scottish review found that it was "likely to remain the standard work until a Government-sponsored survey is undertaken". In the book, Marples "half-humorously" coined the words "leucippotomy" for the cutting of white horses and "gigantotomy" for the cutting of giants.

Reviewing A History of Football (1954), J. P. W. Mallalieu wrote that it told the story of soccer and rugger from the Middle Ages, when football was like "a free fight", and found that the book "may well become the standard work on the social aspects of football".

Princes in the Making (1965) tells the story of royal education, nearly all in private, from Henry VIII to the sons of George V.

== Personal life ==
Marples died in November 1976. He left a widow, Olive Marples, who survived him until 1995.

== Selected publications ==
- Morris Marples, "A Roman Sacrifice" (1927)
- Morris Marples, "The Song of the Siren" (1927)
- Morris Marples, "Island of the Blest – with the Wild Goats in Jura" (The Scots Magazine, Saturday 1 October 1927)
- Morris Marples, "Plautus", Greece & Rome 8.22 (1938)
- Morris Marples, Public School Slang (London: Constable, 1940)
- Morris Marples, Sarn Helen; A Roman Road in Wales (Welsh Outlook Press, 1939)
- Morris Marples, White Horses and Other Hill Figures (London: Country Life, 1949)
- Morris Marples, University Slang (London: Williams & Norgate, 1950)
- Morris Marples, A History of Football (London: Secker & Warburg, 1954)
- Morris Marples, Shank's Pony, a study of walking in Britain (London: Dent, 1959)
- Morris Marples, Princes in the Making: a study of royal education (London: Faber & Faber, 1965)
- Morris Marples, Romantics at School (London: Faber & Faber, 1967)
- Morris Marples, Six Royal Sisters: Daughters of George III (London: Michael Joseph, 1969)
- Morris Marples, Poor Fred and the Butcher: sons of George II (London: Michael Joseph, 1970)

== Honours ==
- 1938: Fellow of the Royal Geographical Society
