= Tysoe =

Civil parish in Warwickshire, England

Coordinates: 52.0924°N 1.5066°W

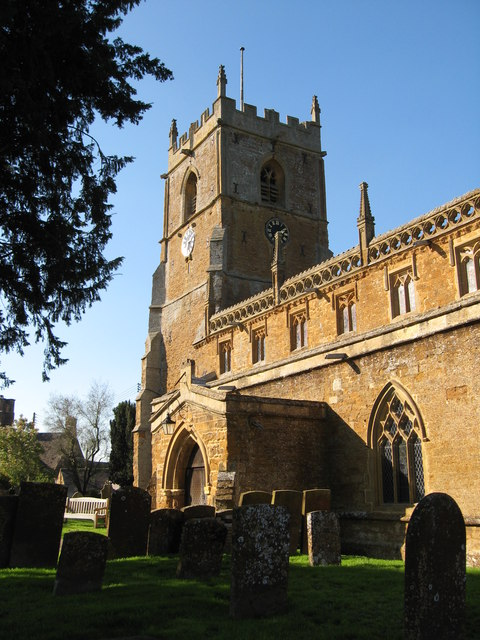
- St Mary's parish church

- Location within Warwickshire
- Population: 1,143 (2011 census)
- OS grid reference: SP3343
- Civil parish: Tysoe
- District: Stratford-on-Avon
- Shire county: Warwickshire
- Region: West Midlands
- Country: England
- Sovereign state: United Kingdom
- Post town: Warwick
- Postcode district: CV35
- Dialling code: 01295
- Police: Warwickshire
- Fire: Warwickshire
- Ambulance: West Midlands
- UK Parliament: Stratford-on-Avon

Tysoe is a civil parish in the Stratford-on-Avon District of Warwickshire, England. The parish is on the boundary with Oxfordshire, about 7 1/2 miles (12 km) northwest of Banbury. The parish includes the contiguous villages of Middle and Upper Tysoe and the separate hamlet of Lower Tysoe. The 2011 census recorded the parish population as 1,143.

== Toponymy ==
The earliest known surviving record of the place-name is as Tiheshoche in the Domesday Book of 1086. It was Tiesoch in the reign of Henry I (1100–35), Thiesho in a charter from 1131 to 1140 and Tisho in a royal roll from 1201. The name is derived from the Old English Tīges hōh, meaning "spur of land belonging to the god Tiw", after whom Tuesday is named. Eilert Ekwall speculated: "The etymology suggested is rendered likely by the fact that at Tysoe was a cut figure of a horse, after which the Vale of the Red Horse was named. The horse may have been a monument to a victory won by the Anglo-Saxons dedicated to the war-god." Ekwall was referring to the Red Horse of Tysoe, a hill figure which was recorded as late as 1607 but which is now lost.

== Parish church ==
The earliest parts of the Church of England parish church of The Assumption of the Blesséd Virgin Mary are two blocked windows on the south side of the nave, which date from late in the 11th century. The south aisle of the nave was added in the middle of the 12th century. In the 13th century the south arcade was extended from three bays to four and the three original arches were altered to give them a pointed Gothic shape. The north aisle was added later and is Decorated Gothic. The nave has a clerestory that was added in the 14th century. In the 15th century the south porch was added, new Perpendicular Gothic windows were inserted and the present west tower was built.

The west tower has a ring of six bells. Richard Sanders of Bromsgrove, Worcestershire cast the treble, second, third and tenor bells in 1719. Abel Rudhall of Gloucester cast the fourth bell in 1750. Matthew III Bagley of Chacombe, Northamptonshire cast the fifth bell in 1782. The church also has a Sanctus bell cast by William Blews and Sons of Birmingham in 1866. In 1854 the church was restored under the direction of the architect George Gilbert Scott. The church is a Grade I listed building. In the churchyard is a 15th-century preaching cross, which is a Grade II* listed building.

== Economic and social history ==
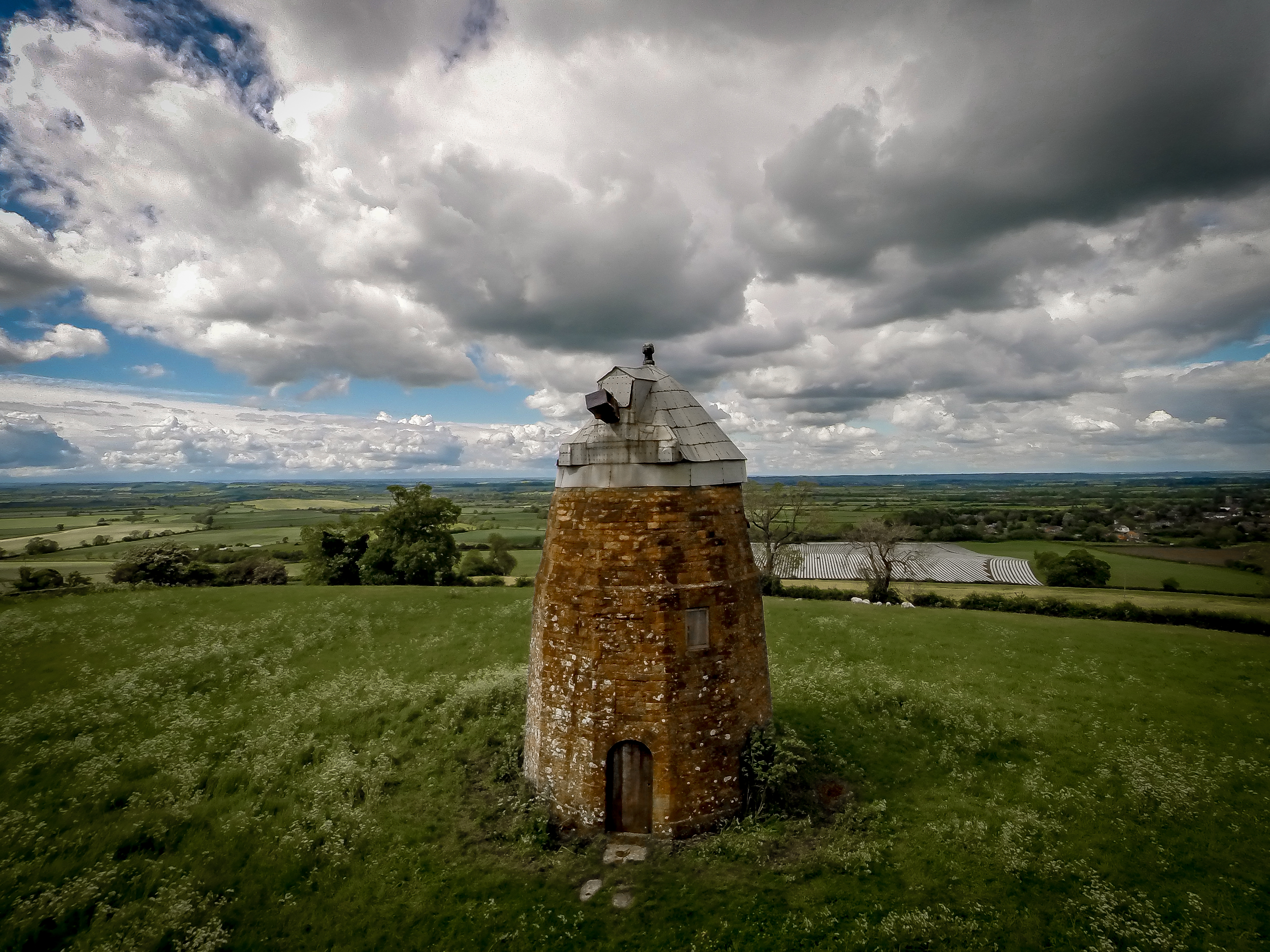
Tysoe Windmill in 2014 with its sails and stocks removed for safety reasons

The oldest part of Tysoe Manor House in Upper Tysoe is the 14th-century hall range. A two-storey wing was added to the house in the 17th century. The house was extended again in 1932–33. It is a Grade II* listed building. All three Tysoe settlements include 17th-century buildings, especially Middle Tysoe, which was once the main village of the parish. About 1/2 mile (800 m) south of Lower Tysoe is an 18th-century tower mill. The tower is built of local ironstone. Tysoe has a Church of England primary school. George Gilbert Scott designed the school's original building, which was built in 1856. Extensions to the building were added in the 1980s and 2005. The agricultural trade unionist Joseph Ashby was born in Tysoe in 1859. His daughter Kathleen Ashby, teacher and historian, was born in Tysoe in 1892 and wrote her father's biography.

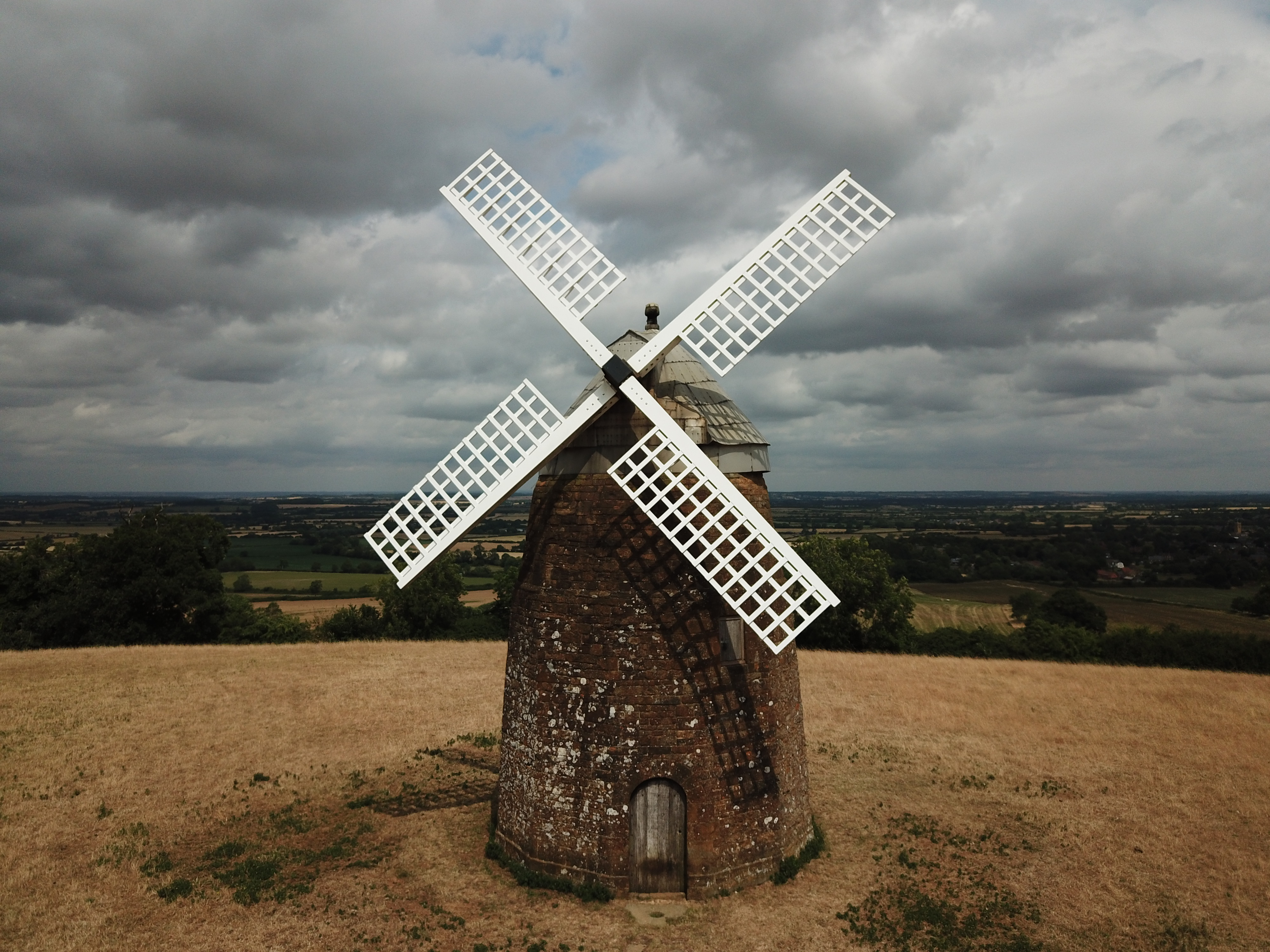
Tysoe Windmill in July 2022 with its sails and stocks restored

Tysoe Windmill is a 12-sided, 3-storey stone tower with 4 common sails and was built during the Imperial period. It stands on the 180-metre-high Windmill Hill between Upper Tysoe and Compton Wynyates. It is thought that Tysoe Windmill may stand on the site of a medieval windmill. The current windmill is topped by an aluminium-plated conical cap with both a finial and tail projection. The mill was in operation until it was struck by lightning in 1915. It has received some restoration over recent years, with a sails replacement in 1935 and further restoration during 1951. During 1968 to 1975 additional restoration was carried out by D. Ogden, financed by the Marquess of Northampton. The windmill still contains all of its machinery, however it is not open to the public. Tysoe Windmill was the focus of the Tysoe Windmill Run on 4 June 2022, and the public footpaths around it are popular with walkers and runners.

== Sources ==
- Ekwall, Eilert (1960) [1936]. Concise Oxford Dictionary of English Place-Names (4th ed.). Oxford: Oxford University Press. ISBN 0198691033.
- Pevsner, Nikolaus; Wedgwood, Alexandra (1966). Warwickshire. The Buildings of England. Harmondsworth: Penguin Books. pp. 435–436.
- Salzman, LF, ed. (1949). "Tysoe". A History of the County of Warwick. Victoria County History. Vol. 5: Kington Hundred. London: Oxford University Press for the Institute of Historical Research. pp. 175–182.
