= Hill figure =

Type of landscape design

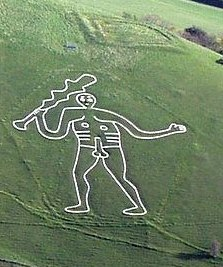
The Cerne Abbas Giant chalk figure, near the village of Cerne Abbas in Dorset, England, is made by a turf-cut.

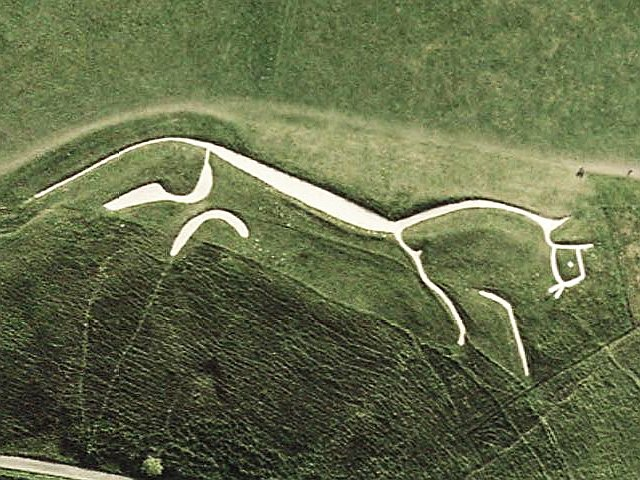
The Uffington White Horse at Uffington, Oxfordshire

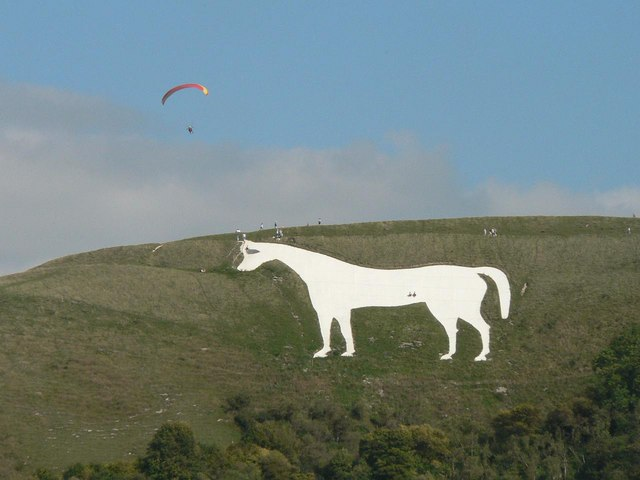
The 18th-century Westbury White Horse near Westbury, Wiltshire

A hill figure is a large visual representation created by cutting into a steep hillside and revealing the underlying geology. It is a type of geoglyph usually designed to be seen from afar rather than above. In some cases trenches are dug and rubble made from material brighter than the natural bedrock is placed into them. The new material is often chalk, a soft and white form of limestone, leading to the alternative name of chalk figure for this form of art.

Hill figures cut in grass are a phenomenon especially seen in England, where examples include the Cerne Abbas Giant, the Uffington White Horse, and the Long Man of Wilmington, as well as the "lost" carvings at Cambridge, Oxford and Plymouth Hoe. From the 18th century onwards, many further ones were added. Many figures long thought to be ancient have been found to be relatively recent when subjected to modern archaeological scrutiny, at least in their current form. Only the Uffington White Horse appears to retain a prehistoric shape, while the Cerne Abbas Giant has been proven to date from the 10th Century. Nevertheless, these figures, and their possible lost companions, have been iconic in the English people's conception of their past.

In England there are at least fifty landscape figures, the majority of which are in the south.

== History ==
The creation of hill figures has been practised since prehistory and can include human and animal forms. Cutting of horses is common, as well as more abstract symbols and, in the modern era, advertising brands.

The reasons for the creation for the figures are varied and obscure. The Uffington Horse probably held political significance, since the figure dominates the valley below. It probably dates to the British Iron Age since coins have been found exhibiting the symbol. The Cerne Abbas Giant might have identified a muster location for West Saxon warriors. Wiltshire is a county with a large number of White Horses; 14 have been recorded. The figures are usually created by the cutting away of the top layer of relatively poor soil on suitable hillsides. This exposes the white chalk beneath, which contrasts well with the short green hill grass, and the image is clearly visible for a considerable distance. Although most of the figures are of great age, many are relatively new. Devizes in Wiltshire created a large white horse for the 2000 Millennium celebrations and in October 2009 celebrated this with an aerial photo of volunteers making the figure 10 for an aerial photo.

Figures must be maintained to remain visible, and local people often work regularly to restore or maintain a local landmark: A lost map of Australia at Compton Chamberlayne, Wiltshire, was restored in 2018.

=== Terminology ===
Geoglyph is the usual term for structures carved into or otherwise made from rock formations.

In 1949, Morris Marples "half-humorously" coined the words "leucippotomy for the cutting of white horses and gigantotomy for the cutting of giants on rare occasions". Though neither word appears in the Oxford English Dictionary, the terms occasionally appear in print.

== Construction and maintenance ==
Until recently, three methods were used to construct white hill figures.

- The stripping method: where the soil is thin, the turf or soil is stripped away to expose the chalk underneath. This produces quick results but the figure needs regular maintenance, as it would soon become overgrown. This was a practice for hill figures but not as much for horses. The Laverstock Panda at Laverstock near Salisbury, Wiltshire was constructed this way in 1968 and is now lost. Traces of figures of this type are not usually found after the figure is overgrown.
- The covering method: rocks are placed on top of the turf. This method is normally used when there is no underlying chalk, the chalk is deep or tools are not available. The maintenance for these figures is very high. There are several examples, such as the Woolbury White Horse in Hampshire. This method leaves no trace of the figure's existence when overgrown, as is the case of the lost Fovant Badges in Wiltshire.
- The trenching method, which is by far the most common method of hill figure construction. The underlying chalk where some white horses are constructed is not near the surface, so a trench is dug and chalk from another site is used to fill it. The Uffington White Horse in Oxfordshire is the prime example of this method. This method is invasive in the hillside and allows traces of the figure to be seen even when the figure has been overgrown for many years, an example being the original Devizes White Horse, cut in 1845 and lost sometime in the mid 20th century, but rediscovered when traces reappeared.

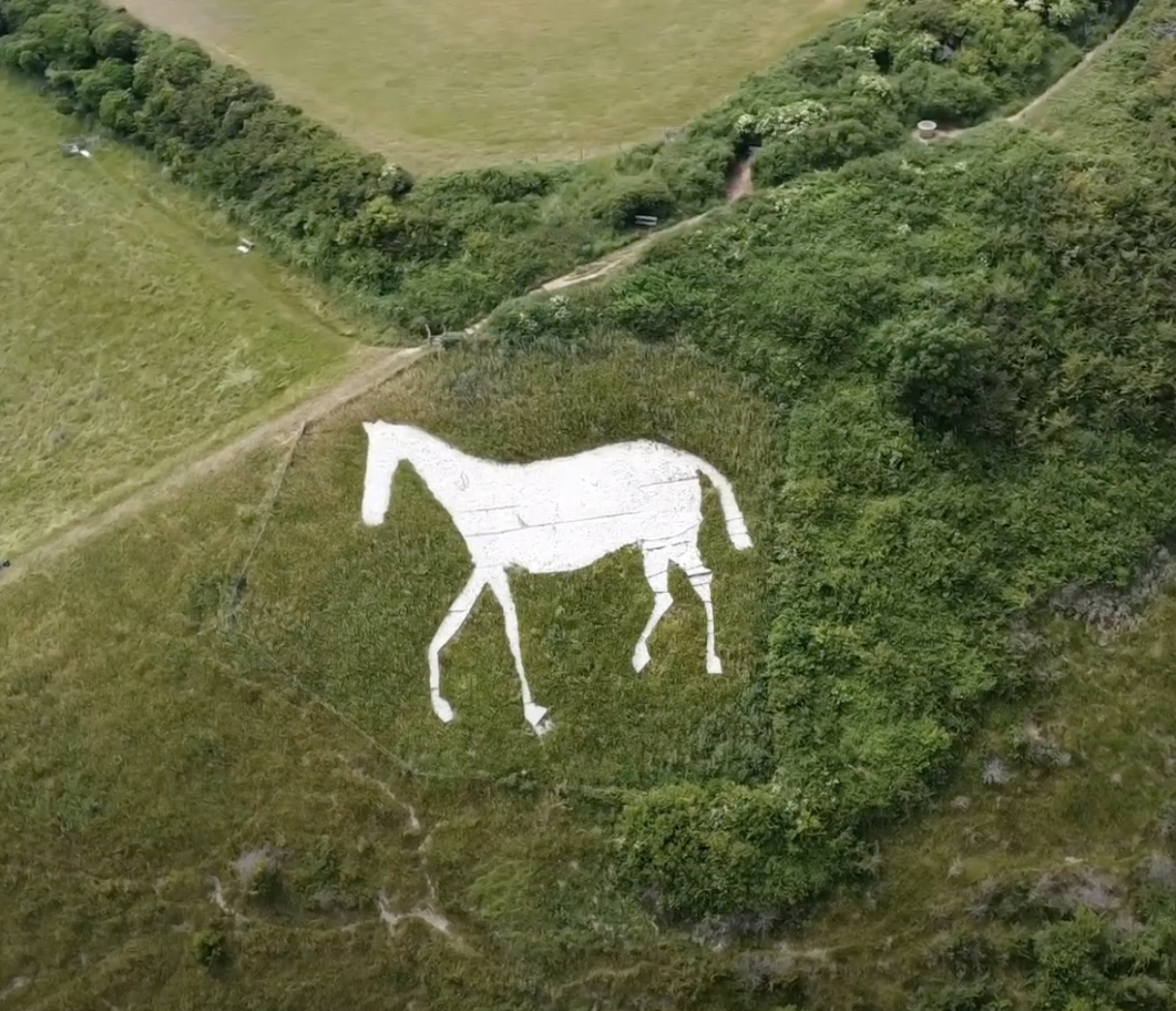
The Litlington White Horse in the South Downs, East Sussex

The biggest threat to white horses and other hill figures is natural vegetation covering the figures. In the case of chalk figures, natural vegetation encroaches from the edges and can grow on soil washed onto the figure by rain. Water erosion can also be a problem on steep or gentle slopes, because rain can wash the chalk off the horse, or soil onto the horse. Larger horses are more susceptible to this. If chalk is washed off the horse, the horse gradually creeps down the slope; or if soil is washed onto the horse, it collects onto the lower edges and the horse gradually climbs up the slope. A solution is to provide drainage, either using run-off drains, as at Uffington White Horse, or a french ditch.

Since hill figures must be maintained by the removal of regrown turf, only those that motivate the local populace to look after them survive. Surviving ancient figures all have an associated fair or ceremony that involves maintaining them.

Unmaintained figures gradually fade away. Firle Corn at Firle Beacon, Sussex could be a lost figure. Its existence is suggested by infrared photography. If it is a lost figure, its age is uncertain, and unlikely prehistoric in origin, as only one figure in the UK has been shown to be of this age, the Uffington White Horse.

== Human figures ==
=== UK ===
While often presumed to be of prehistoric origin, surviving examples may have been created only within the last four hundred years. Of these giants only two survive: one near the village of Cerne Abbas, to the north of Dorchester, in Dorset and one at Wilmington, Long Man civil parish in the Wealden District of East Sussex. Examples located at Oxford, Cambridge, Litlington, Clifton, Bristol, and on Plymouth Hoe can no longer be seen with the naked eye.

The Osmington White Horse carries a rider (King George III) but is not considered an example of gigantotomy due to the name of the figure referring to the horse.

==== Cerne Abbas Giant ====
The Cerne Abbas Giant, also referred to as the "Rude Man" or the "Rude Giant", is a hill figure of a giant naked man 180 ft (55 m) high, 167 ft (51 m) wide. The figure is carved into the side of a steep hill, and is best viewed from the opposite side of the valley or from the air. The carving is formed by a trench 12 in (30 cm) wide, and about the same depth, which has been cut through grass and earth into the underlying chalk. In his right hand the giant holds a knobbled club 120 ft (37 m) in length.

Its documented history cannot be traced back further than the late 17th century, but was dated in 2020 to the 10th Century. Above and to the right of the Giant's head is an earthwork known as the "Trendle", or "Frying Pan". Medieval writings refer to this location as "Trendle Hill", but make no mention of the giant, indicating it had become obscured at various points in its history. In contrast, the Uffington White Horse – an unquestionably prehistoric hill figure on the Berkshire Downs – was noticed and recorded by medieval authors. In 2021, a sediment analysis by the National Trust indicated an origin in the date range of 700 CE to 1100 CE, surprising historians who did not expect it to be medieval.

In 2008, overgrowth forced a re-chalking of the giant, with 17 tonnes of new chalk being poured in and tamped down by hand.

==== Long Man of Wilmington ====
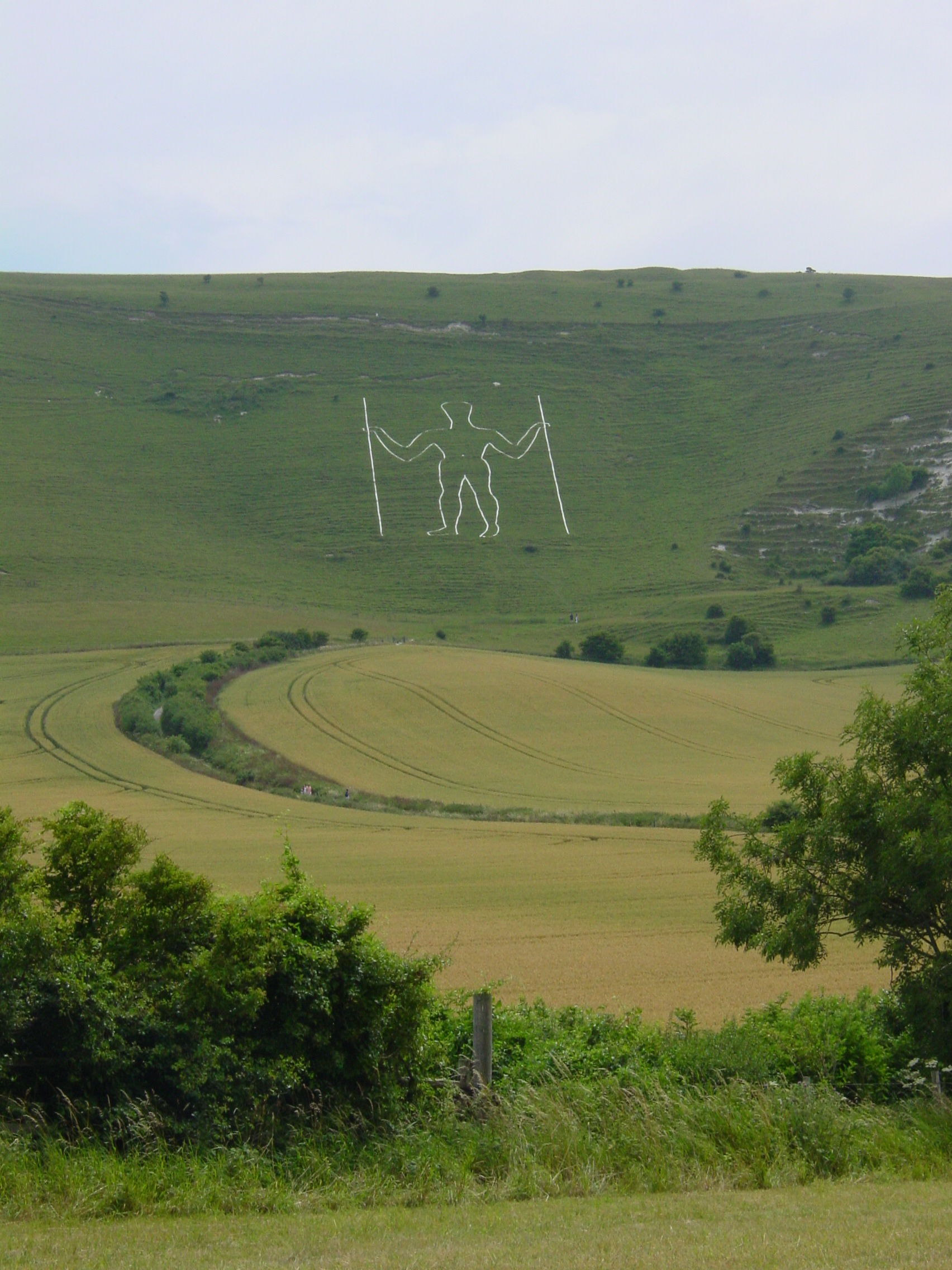
The Long Man of Wilmington seen from a distance

The Long Man of Wilmington is located on one of the steep slopes of Windover Hill, six miles (9.7 km) northwest of Eastbourne. The figure is 227 feet (69 m) tall and designed to look in proportion when viewed from below, and is shown holding two staves. The earliest record was made by the surveyor John Rowley in the year 1710. This drawing suggests that the original figure was a shadow or indentation in the grass, rather than the solid outline of a human figure. The staves were not depicted as a rake and scythe as was once thought, and the head was a helmet shape. Sir William Borrow's drawing of 1766 shows the figure holding a rake and a scythe, both shorter than the staves.

Before 1874, the Long Man's outline was only visible in certain light conditions as a different shade in the hillside grass, or after a light fall of snow. In that year an antiquarian marked out the outline with yellow bricks, later cemented together. It has been claimed that the 'restoration' process distorted the position of the feet, an assertion backed up by several who had been familiar with the figure before 1874, and also by later resistivity surveys. It has also been suggested that it removed the Long Man's genitalia, though there is no historical or archaeological evidence which supports that claim. A wide range of dates of origin has been proposed for the Long Man, but more recent archaeological work done by the University of Reading suggests that the figure dates from the 16th or 17th century AD.

==== Plymouth Hoe Giants ====
Until the early 17th century large outline images of the two giants, perhaps Gog and Magog (or Goemagot and Corineus) had for a long time been cut into the turf of Plymouth Hoe exposing the white limestone beneath. An early and explicit reference was made to them by Richard Carew in 1602. At one time these figures were periodically re-cut and cleaned but no trace of them remains today.

==== Giant of Hindover Hill ====
The Giant of Hindover Hill is a lost chalk hill figure believed to have once accompanied the original Litlington White Horse on Hindover Hill in Litlington, East Sussex. References to the figure appear in the 19th century, with some historians suggesting it resembled the nearby Long Man of Wilmington. It was reportedly known alongside the Wilmington figure as "Adam and Eve," and some accounts describe it as a female giant or goddess. By the early 20th century, mentions of the giant had largely disappeared, and by the 1920s, reports confirmed that both the horse and the figure had faded from view, with no clear evidence of their existence remaining.

==== Firle Corn ====
Firle Corn in Firle, Sussex is a nearly-lost hill figure which can be seen with the aid of infrared photography. Now looking more like a small ear of corn or a strange weapon than a human figure, there is a legend suggesting that a giant called Gill was once cut on this same hill and that he was considered an adversary of the Long Man of Wilmington not far away. According to one story, the giant on Firle Beacon threw his hammer at the Wilmington giant and killed him, and that the figure on the hillside marks the place where his body fell.

==== Homer Simpson ====
As a publicity stunt for the opening of The Simpsons Movie on 16 July 2007, a giant Homer Simpson brandishing a doughnut was outlined in water-based biodegradable paint to the left of the Cerne Abbas Giant. This act angered local neopagans, who pledged to perform "rain magic" to wash the figure away.

=== Other countries ===
- Atacama Giant

== Horse figures ==
There are 16 known white horse hill figures in the UK, or 17 including the painted one at Cleadon Hills, with eight of them being in Wiltshire.

In 1949, in his White Horses and Other Figures, Morris Marples "half-humorously" coined the word "leucippotomy" for the cutting of white horses

=== List of UK figures ===
==== Current figures ====
No.	Name	County	Cutting date
1	Uffington White Horse	Oxfordshire	1000 BC
2	Westbury White Horse	Wiltshire	1600s
3	Cherhill White Horse	Wiltshire	1780
4	Mormond White Horse	Aberdeenshire	1790s
5	Marlborough White Horse	Wiltshire	1804
6	Osmington White Horse	Dorset	1808
7	Alton Barnes White Horse	Wiltshire	1812
8	Hackpen White Horse	Wiltshire	1838
9	Woolbury White Horse	Hampshire	Before 1846
10	Kilburn White Horse	North Yorkshire	1857
11	Broad Town White Horse	Wiltshire	1864
12	Cleadon White Horse	South Tyneside	Before 1887
13	Litlington White Horse	East Sussex	1924
14	Pewsey White Horse	Wiltshire	1937
15	Devizes White Horse	Wiltshire	1999
16	Heeley White Horse	South Yorkshire	2000
17	Folkestone White Horse	Kent	2003
18	Lutterworth white horses	Leicestershire	2012
19	Beverley Racecourse white horses	East Riding	2010s
20	Black Horse of Bush Howe	Cumbria	? (may be a natural figure)

==== Lost figures ====
Name	County	Cut	Lost	Replaced by
Old Westbury White Horse	Wiltshire	878?	Before 1778	New Westbury White Horse
The Giant Ghyst	Clifton, Bristol	Before 1480		
Plymouth Hoe Gogmagog	Devon	Before 1486	Late 1660s	–
Wandlebury Hill Gogmagog	Cambridgeshire	Before 1605	Around 1730	–
Old Pewsey White Horse	Wiltshire	1785	1940	New Pewsey White Horse
Pitstone Hill White Horse	Buckinghamshire	1809?	Before 1990	–
Old Litlington White Horse	Sussex	1838	1924	New Litlington White Horse
The Giant of Hindover Hill	Sussex	Before 1850	1924	-
Old Devizes White Horse	Wiltshire	1845	Before 1999	New Devizes White Horse
Hackpen White Horse	Wiltshire	1868?	Before 1990	–
Hindhead White Horse	Surrey	Before 1913	1939	–
Red Horse of Tysoe	Warwickshire	Before 1607	Remains lost in 1964	-
Red Horse of Tysoe "IV"	Warwickshire	1800	1910	–
Rockley White Horse	Wiltshire	Discovered 1948	After 1950, before 1990	–
Tan Hill White Horse/Donkey	Wiltshire	Before 1975	After 1975, before 1990	–
Mossley White Horse (aka Luzley White Horse)	Greater Manchester	1981	After 1994, before 1999	–
Folkestone White Horse mock-up	Kent	1999	1999	Folkestone White Horse
Laverstock Panda	Wiltshire	1969	1984	–
Pont Abraham Tea Pot and Cup	Wales	1992	2009	–

==== Possible figures ====
Name	County	Discovery date	Note
Whittlesford White Horse	Cambridge	2004	A crop mark resembling a horse discovered 2004, possibly hinting a previous horse was cut here.
Liddington White Horse	Wiltshire	2000s	Plans for this white horse (including designs) occurred in the 2000s, but the project never happened.
Red Horse of Tysoe "VI"	Warwickshire	2010s	A forthcoming recutting of the Red Horse of Tysoe at the Vale of the Red Horse.

=== List of international figures ===
Name	Location	Cut	Lost
Bloemfontein White Horse	Bloemfontein, South Africa	Before 1932	N/A
Cockington Green white horse	Cockington Green, Canberra, Australia	20th or 21st century	N/A
Georgia white horse	Georgia, United States	20th or 21st century	N/A
Juárez White Horse	Ciudad Juárez, Mexico	Unknown	N/A
Riff Country horse	Iourdanan, Morocco	Unknown	Unknown
Spis Castle Celtic Horse	Žehra, Slovakia	2000s	N/A
Tunis Horses	Tunis, Tunisia	Unknown	N/A
Waimate White	Waimate, New Zealand	1968	N/A

The horses in Cockington Green, Georgia and Juárez are all based on the style of or direct copies of the Uffington White Horse.

== Other figures ==
=== UK ===
- Bulford Kiwi, Sling Camp (1919)
- Compton Chamberlayne Australia map, Wiltshire (1916)
- Fovant badges, Wiltshire (1916-)
- Lenham Cross, Kent (1922)
- Shoreham, Kent memorial cross, Kent (1920)
- Sutton Mandeville military badges, Wiltshire (1916)
- Whipsnade white lion, Bedfordshire (1931)
- Whitehawk hawk, Sussex (2001)
- Whiteleaf Cross, Monks Risborough, Buckinghamshire (earliest ref. 1742)
- Wye Crown, Kent (1902)
- Mormond White Stag, on the other side of the hill from the Mormond Horse.

== References in other art forms ==
The white horses of Wiltshire, of which there are currently nine, have inspired other sculptures in the county. Julive Livsey's sculpture White Horse Pacified (1987) in Shaw, Swindon was inspired by the white horses.

In 2010, Charlotte Moreton created the steel sculpture White Horse for Solstice Park, Amesbury, taking influence from white horses.

The Westbury White Horse is depicted on a roundabout and mosaic in the town.

An 1872 sketch of the Cherhill White Horse was incorporated into an unofficial flag of Wiltshire.

The Town Flag of Pewsey, registered in September 2014, features the Pewsey White Horse at its centre.

== Gallery ==
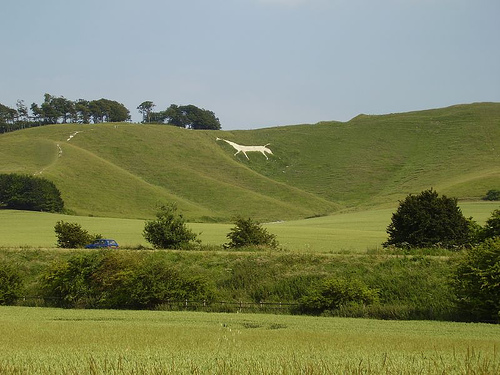
The Cherhill White Horse near Cherhill

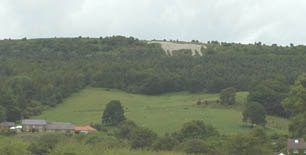
The Kilburn White Horse near Kilburn, North Yorkshire

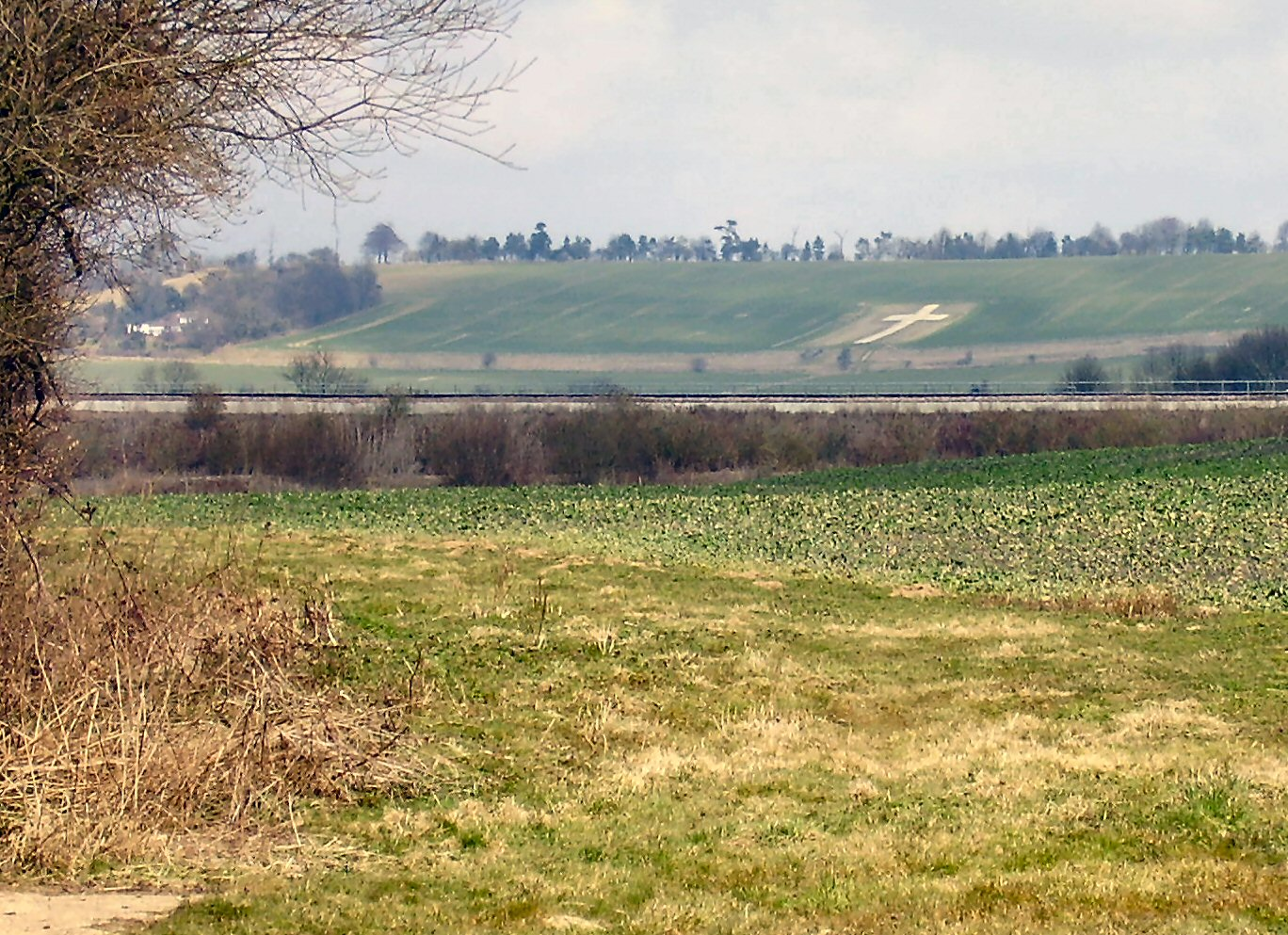
Lenham Cross on the North Downs in Kent

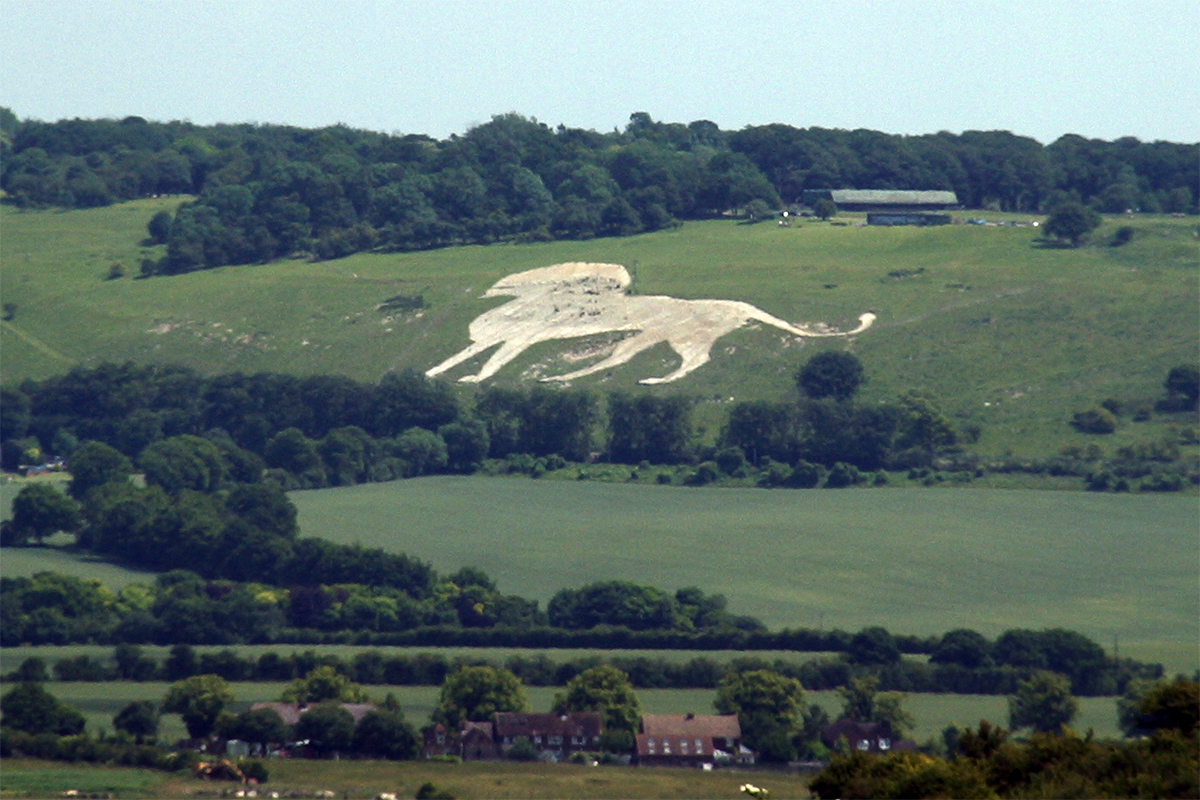
Figure of a lion cut into the hillside: the Whipsnade Zoo lion near Whipsnade

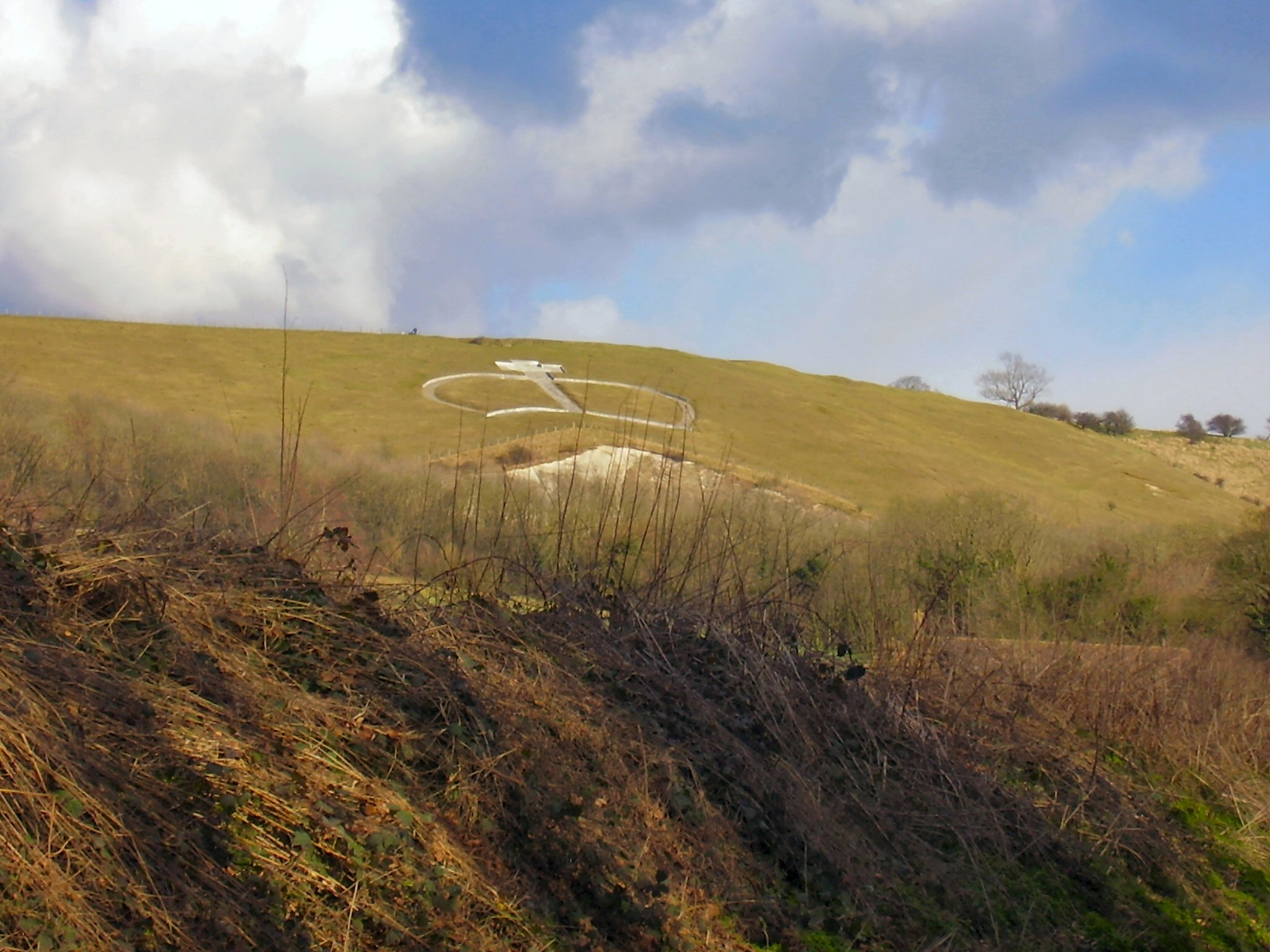
Outline of a crown cut into the hillside. Wye Crown, at Wye, Kent

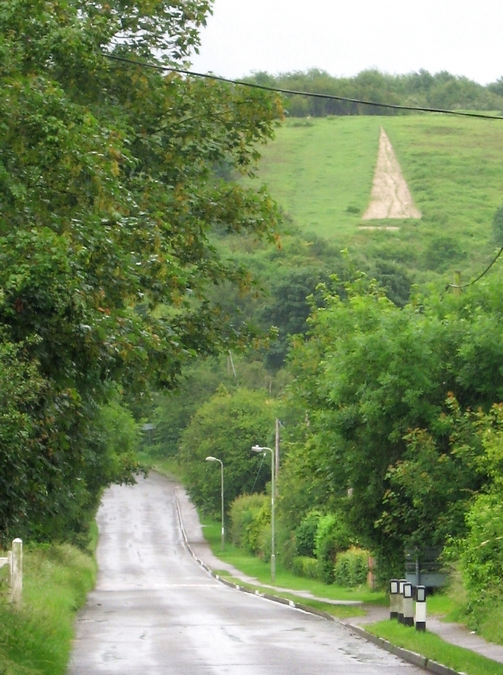
An offwhite triangle cut into the hillside. Watlington White Mark

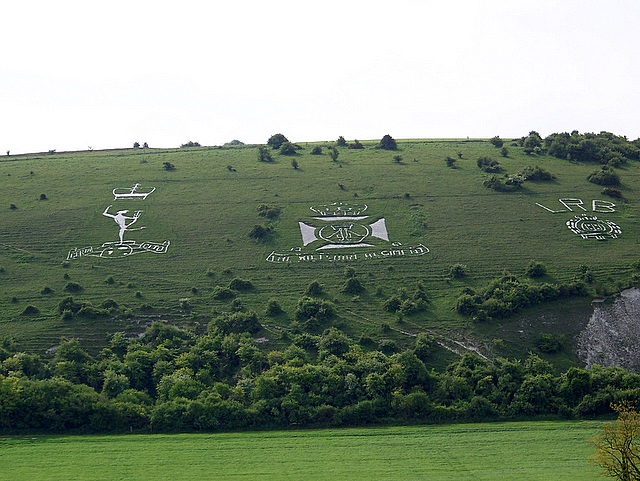
Three military badges from the Fovant badges

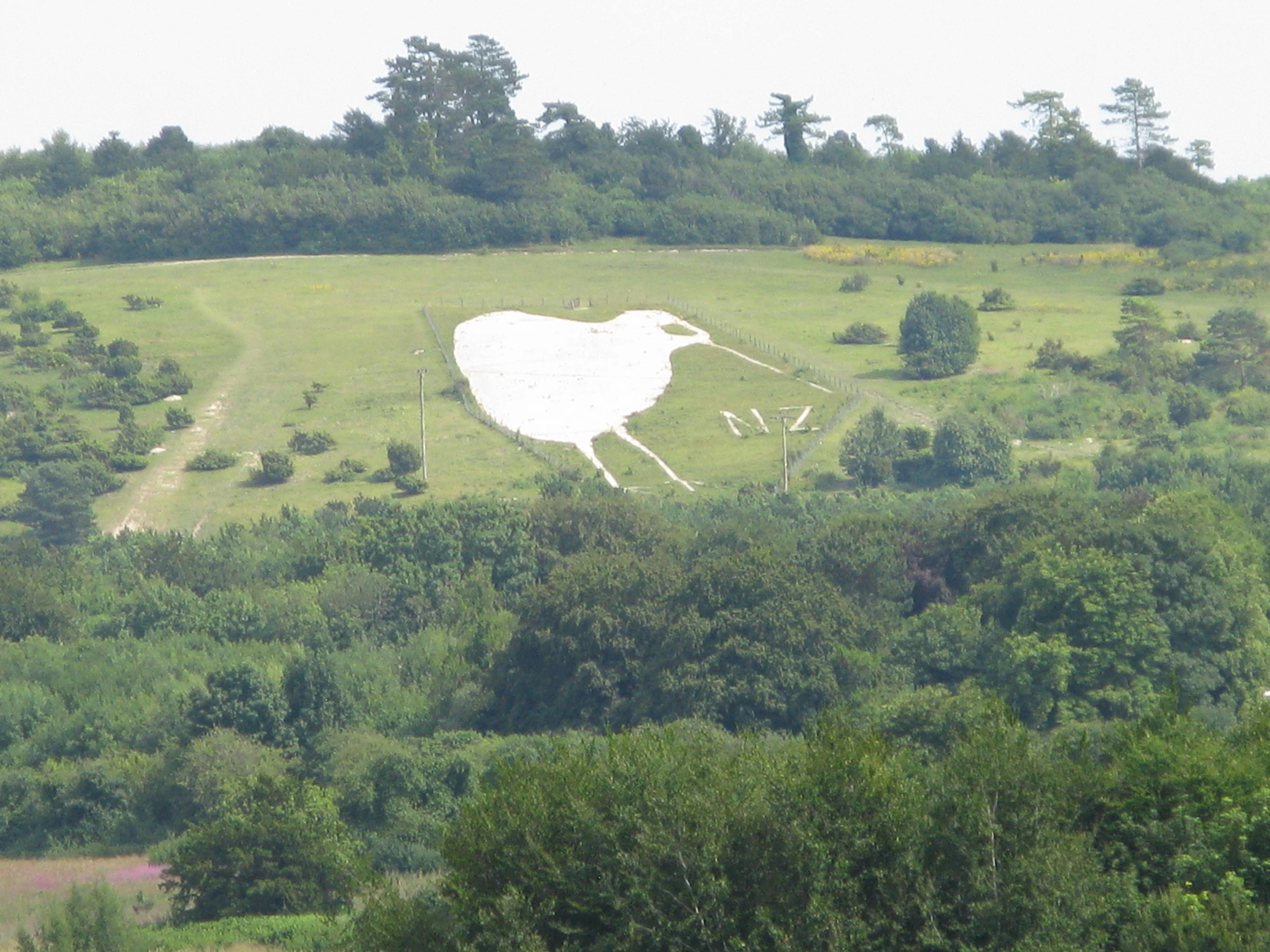
A kiwi cut into the hillside. The Bulford Kiwi near Bulford

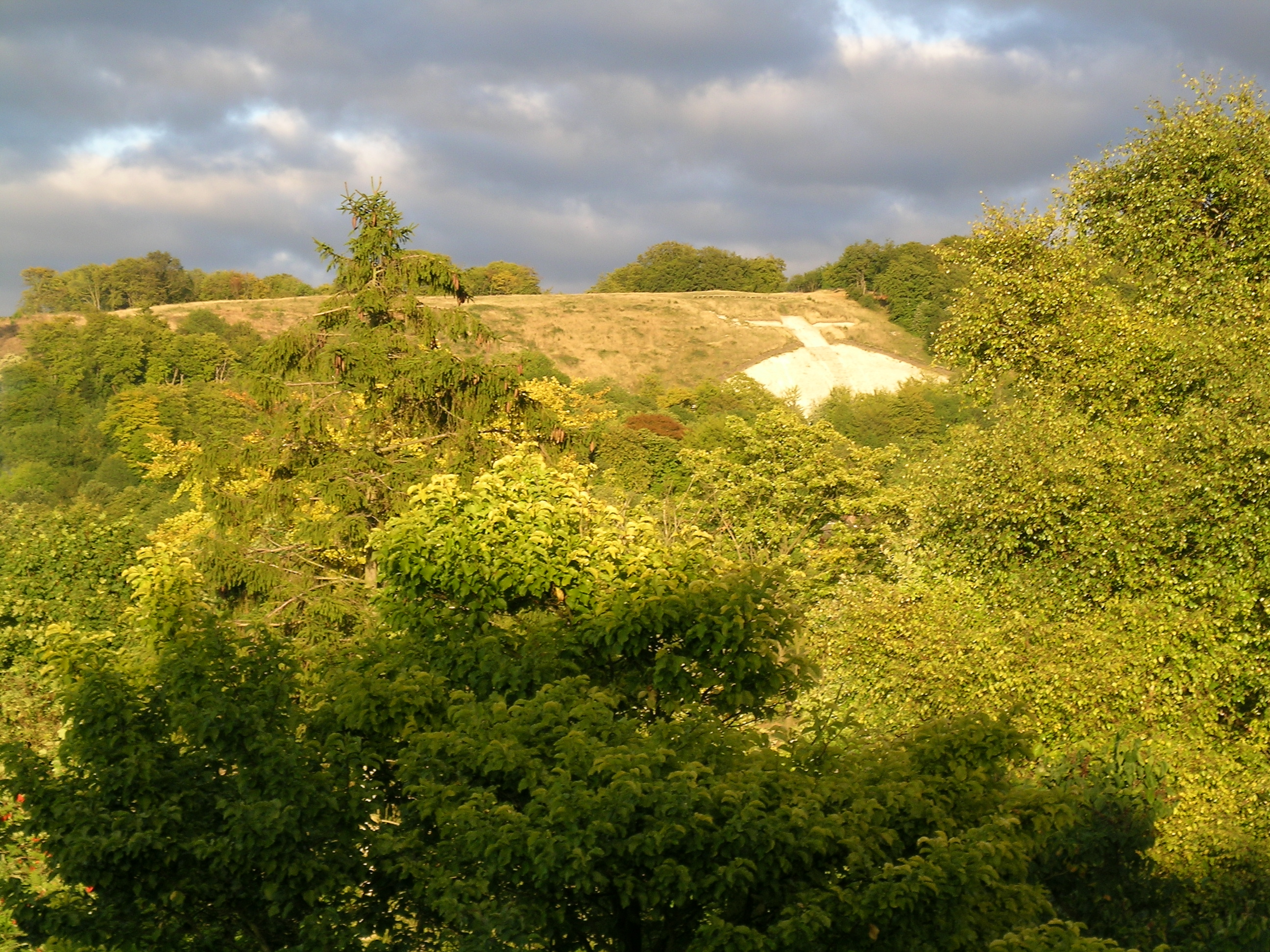
A white cross cut into the hillside. Whiteleaf Cross

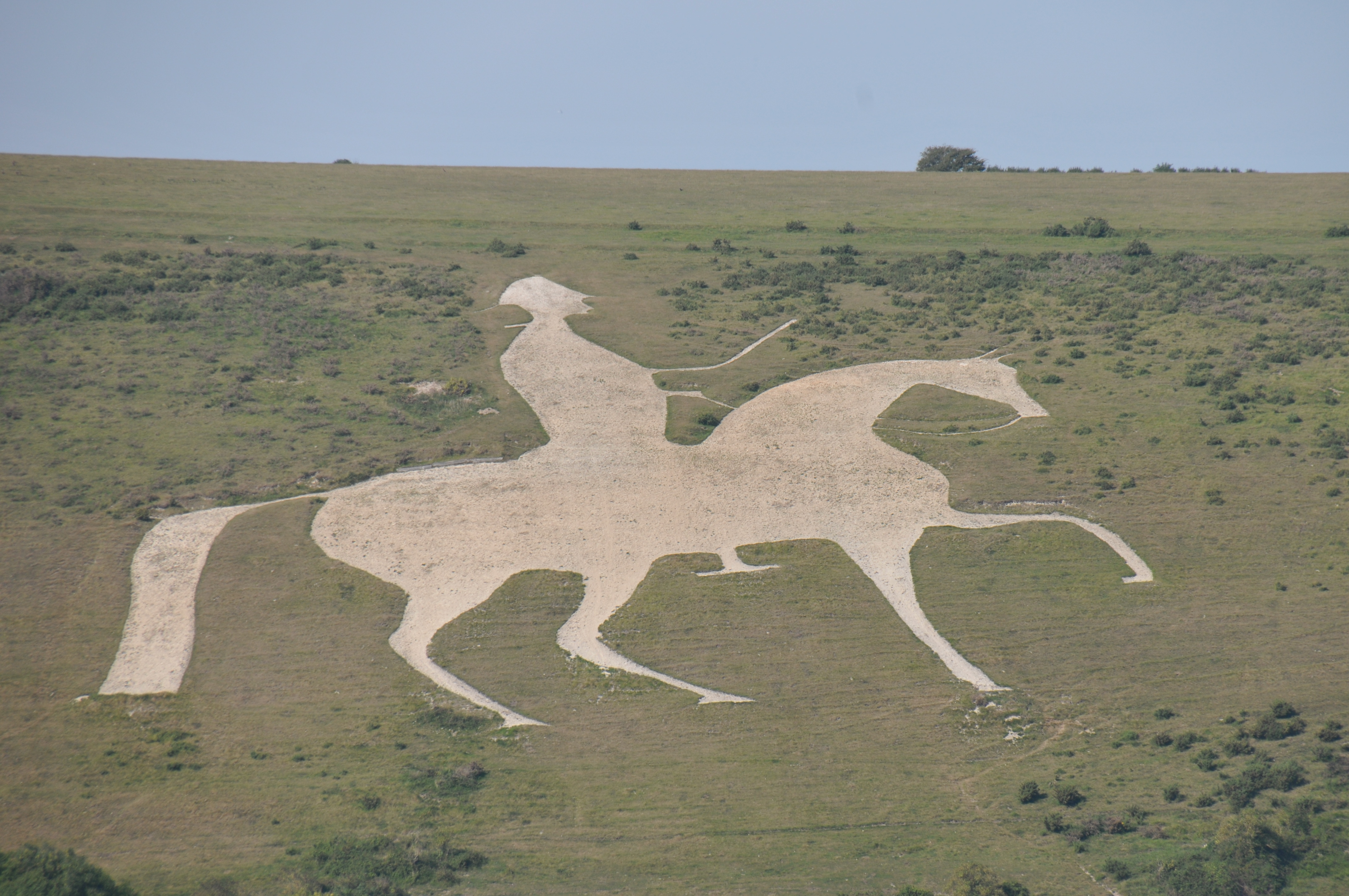
White horse with George III riding; Osmington White Horse near Weymouth, Dorset

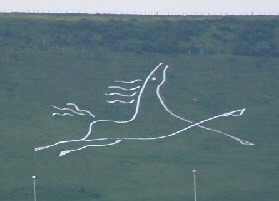
A stylised figure of a galloping white horse. Folkestone White Horse on Cheriton Hill, Folkestone

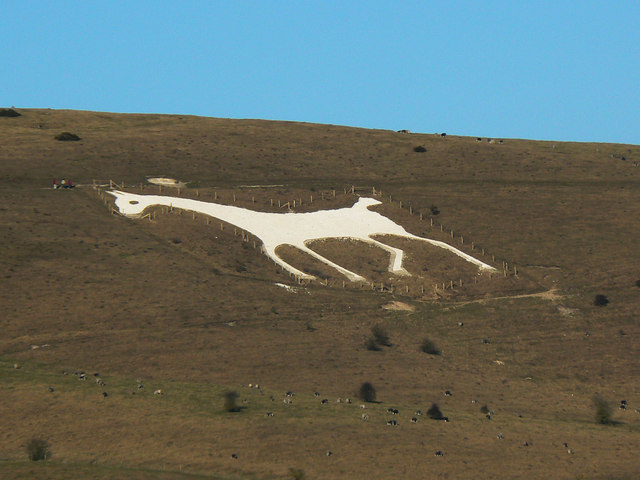
Alton Barnes White Horse

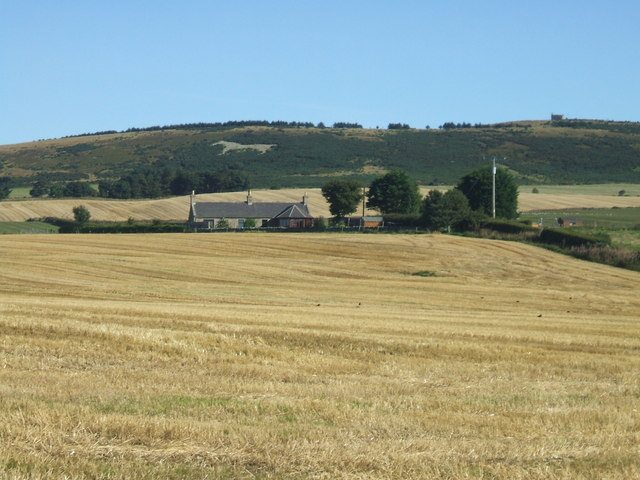
The Mormond Hill White Horse, near Fraserburgh, Aberdeenshire

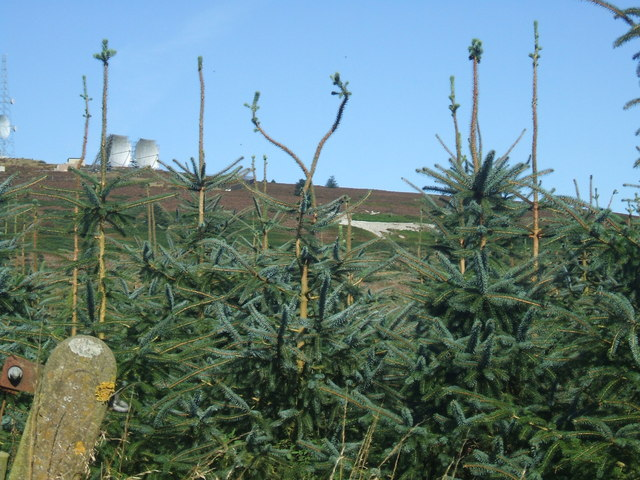
The Mormond Hill White Stag, near Fraserburgh, Aberdeenshire

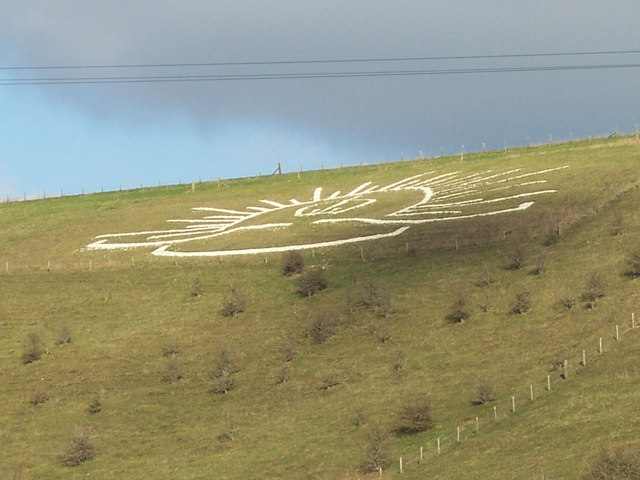
The Lamb Down Badge, near Codford, Wiltshire

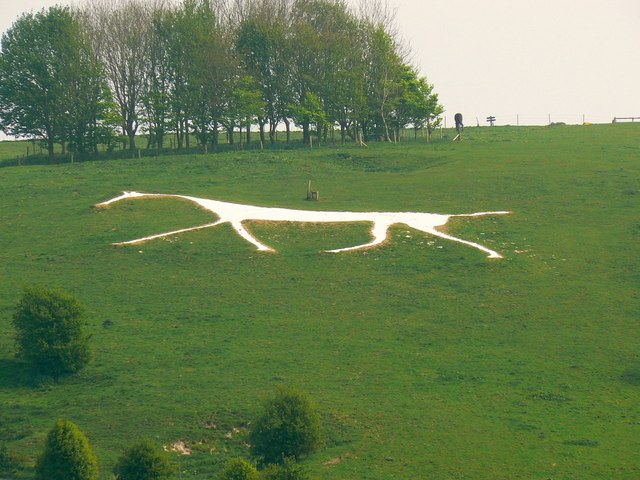
Hackpen White Horse

Pendle Hill marked with the date 1612 on the 400th anniversary of the Witch Trials
Drawings of English hill figures
The Cherhill White Horse in 1892

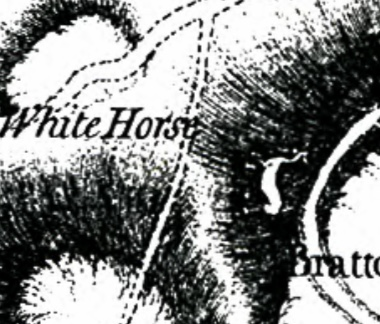
The Westbury White Horse in 1772

The Uffington White Horse in 1885.

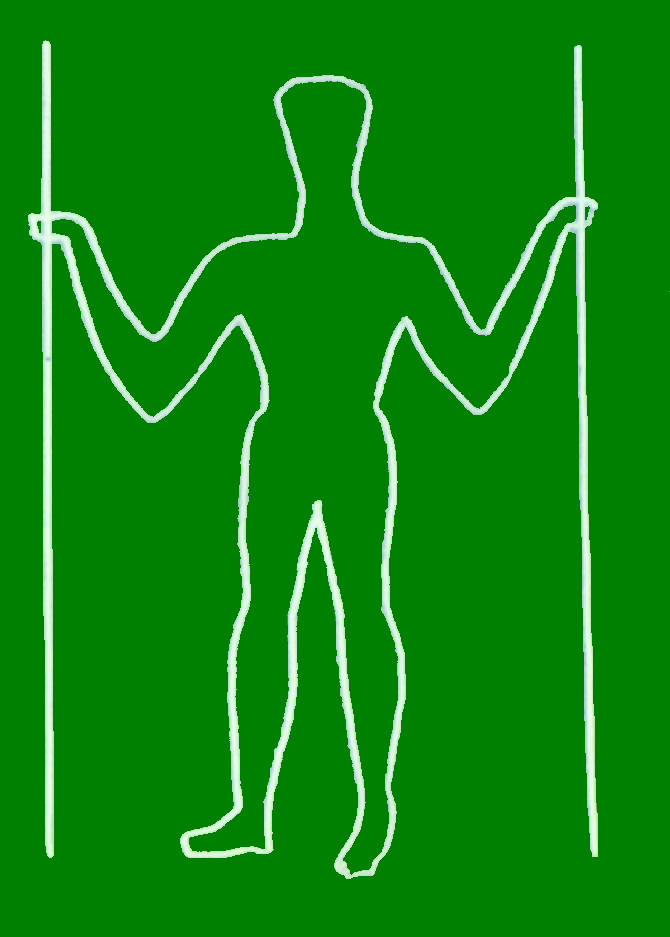
Layout of the Long Man of Wilmington

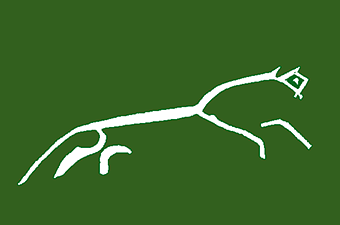
Layout of the Uffington White Horse

Layout of the Cerne Abbas Giant

== In popular culture ==
=== Poetry and prose ===
- The Ballad of the White Horse by G. K. Chesterton
- The Scouring of the White Horse by Tom Hughes
- Sun Horse, Moon Horse by Rosemary Sutcliff
- Witch Hill by Marcus Sedgwick
- Find the White Horse by Dick King-Smith
- A Hat Full of Sky by Terry Pratchett
- The Dark Is Rising Sequence by Susan Cooper
- The Sandman by Neil Gaiman
- The Language of Bees by Laurie R. King
- The Westbury White Horse is mentioned in the novel The English Patient by Michael Ondaatje, but was not featured in the film of the novel.

=== Music videos ===
- Alton Barnes White Horse appears, very briefly, in the music video for Staying Out for the Summer by Dodgy.
- Cherhill White Horse features in the music video for Doctorin' the Tardis by The Timelords.
- Uffington White Horse (in animated form) features in the music video for Sonnet by The Verve.
- Westbury White Horse features in the music video for Breathe by Midge Ure, alongside a temporary figure of the sun.

== See also ==
- Anglo-Saxon paganism
- English folklore
- Gog Magog Hills, an unverified claim of geoglyphs
- Hillside letters, a similar type of geoglyph common in the Western U.S., but using letters instead of figures
- Nazca Lines, geoglyphs etched into the Nazca Plain
- White horse (mythology)

== Bibliography ==
- Newman, Paul (1997). Lost Gods of Albion: The Chalk Hill-Figures of Britain (2nd ed.). Stroud: Sutton. ISBN 0-7509-1563-3.
- Plenderleath, W C (1892). The White Horses of the West of England (2nd ed.). London: Allen & Storr.
