= Litlington =

Litlington or Littlington can refer to:

== People ==
- William of Littlington (died c. 1310), English Carmelite friar

== Places ==
- Litlington, Cambridgeshire
- Litlington, East Sussex
  - Litlington White Horse

== See also ==
- Lillington (disambiguation)
