= Pagden =

Pagden may refer to:

- Anthony Pagden (born 1945), author and professor of political science and history
- Arthur Sampson Pagden (1858-1942), a colonial public servant
- James Pagden (1814–1872), English cricketer
