= Lillingston =

Lillingston is a surname, otherwise spelled Lillingstone or Lillingstein. It may be a toponymic surname from Lilienstein in Saxon Switzerland, Germany.

' Lillystone ' with ancient origins in Ireland and Yorkshire. " Lillis" or " Lawless ".. once Irish outlaws banished to the English mainland.

Often misspelt with variations of the word Lily, Lilly or Lili.

Lillystone appears as a surname in North Yorkshire predominantly.

== Notable people with the surname ==
- Eduardo Lillingston (born 1977), Mexican footballer
- Jessie Lillingston, later Jessie, Lady Street (1889–1970), Australian diplomat
- Luke Lillingston (1653–1713), British Army general
- Sandie Lillingston, Australian actress

== See also ==
- Lillington (disambiguation)
- Lillingstone (disambiguation)
