= Herbert Lawrence =

British Army general and businessman (1861–1943)

General Sir Herbert Lawrence GCB
- Portrait by Walter Stoneman, 1918
- Born: Herbert Alexander Lawrence; 8 August 1861; London, England
- Died: 17 January 1943 (aged 81); Little Berkhamsted, England
- Burial place: Seal, Kent
- Spouse: Isabel Mary Mills (m. 1892)
- Relatives: John Lawrence, 1st Baron Lawrence (father)
- Military career
- Allegiance: United Kingdom
- Branch: British Army
- Service years: 1882–1903; 1914–1919
- Rank: General
- Commands: 66th (2nd East Lancashire) Division (1917); 71st Division (1916–17); 52nd (Lowland) Infantry Division (1915–16); 127th (Manchester) Brigade (1915)
- Conflicts: Second Boer War; First World War
- Awards: Knight Grand Cross of the Order of the Bath; Grand Officer of the Legion of Honour (France); Croix de Guerre (France); Grand Cross of the Order of the Crown (Belgium); Croix de Guerre (Belgium); Army Distinguished Service Medal (United States); Grand Officer of the Order of Karađorđe's Star (Serbia); Grand Officer of the Military Order of Aviz (Portugal)
- Other work: Chairman of Glyn, Mills & Co. Bank

General Sir Herbert Alexander Lawrence GCB (8 August 1861 – 17 January 1943) was a general in the British Army, a banker and a businessman.

He worked alongside Major Douglas Haig (Assistant Adjutant General) as Intelligence head of General French's staff during the Second Boer War, and was Haig's Chief of Staff in the final year of World War I.

== Early life ==
Lawrence was born in Southgate, North London, on 8 August 1861, the son of Sir John Laird Mair Lawrence, later Lord Lawrence and the Governor-General of India, and his wife Harriette Katherine Hamilton. He was educated at Harrow School and the Royal Military College, Sandhurst.

== Early military career ==
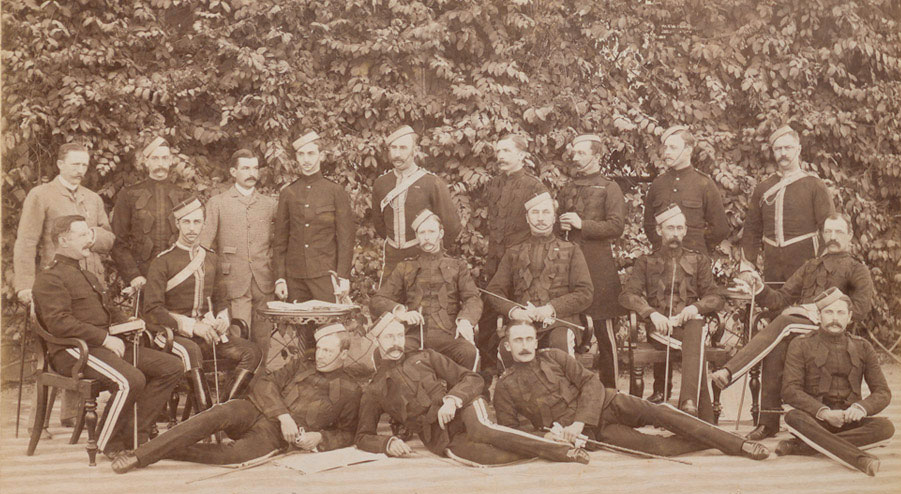
Officers of the 17th Lancers, Lucknow, India, November 1885. In the front row, sat on the ground and first on the left, is Lieutenant Lawrence.

Commissioned into the 17th Lancers as a lieutenant on 10 May 1882, he was stationed in India and promoted to captain on 25 February 1892 before he entered the Staff College, Camberley, earning his psc, in 1896. After graduating from Camberley in 1896 he returned to serve with his regiment, but not for long. He was then, in September 1897, appointed a staff captain (intelligence) at the War Office in succession to Henry Wilson, a future field marshal, before serving there as a deputy assistant adjutant general from May 1898.

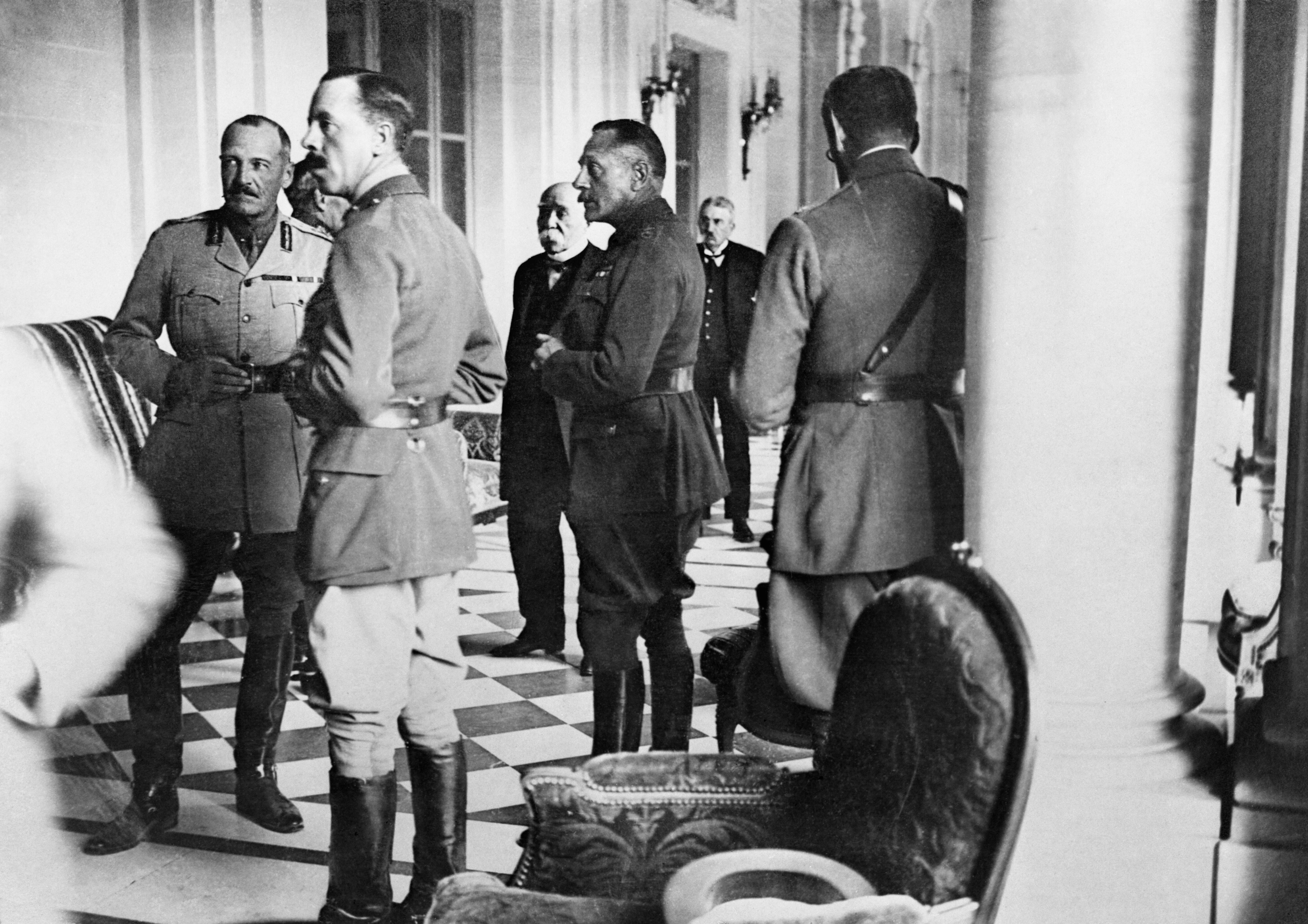
Field Marshal Douglas Haig, French Prime Minister Georges Clemenceau, and French Minister of Foreign Affairs Stéphen Pichon at the Inter-Allied Conference at Versaille in the vestibule before the session, 2 July 1918. On the left is Haig's CGS, Lieutenant General Lawrence.

He was promoted to major on 22 November 1899, shortly after the outbreak of the Second Boer War in South Africa and shortly after being appointed a deputy assistant adjutant general for intelligence on the staff of Lieutenant General Sir John French's Cavalry Division with Douglas Haig and received a brevet promotion to lieutenant colonel in the 16th Lancers on 29 November 1900. In February 1901 he resumed his former role of DAAG at the War Office. For his service in the war, he was twice mentioned in despatches and received the Queen's South Africa Medal with six clasps. He stayed in South Africa throughout the war, which ended in May 1902 with the Peace of Vereeniging. Four months later, he was among 540 officers and men of the 17th Lancers who left Cape Town on the SS German in late September 1902, and arrived at Southampton in late October, when they were posted to Edinburgh.

He resigned his commission in 1903 and became a city banker. He was also a director of the Midland Railway. He was promoted to lieutenant colonel while commanding the King's Colonials in April 1904. In April 1908, when the Territorial Force was created, he was made an honorary colonel.

== First World War ==
When the First World War started in August 1914 he was recalled for army service and became general staff officer of the 2nd Yeomanry Division, serving in Egypt and at Gallipoli. In June 1915 he was promoted to the temporary rank of brigadier general and given the command of the 127th (Manchester) Brigade, part of the 42nd (East Lancs) Territorial Division, a Territorial Force (TF) formation.

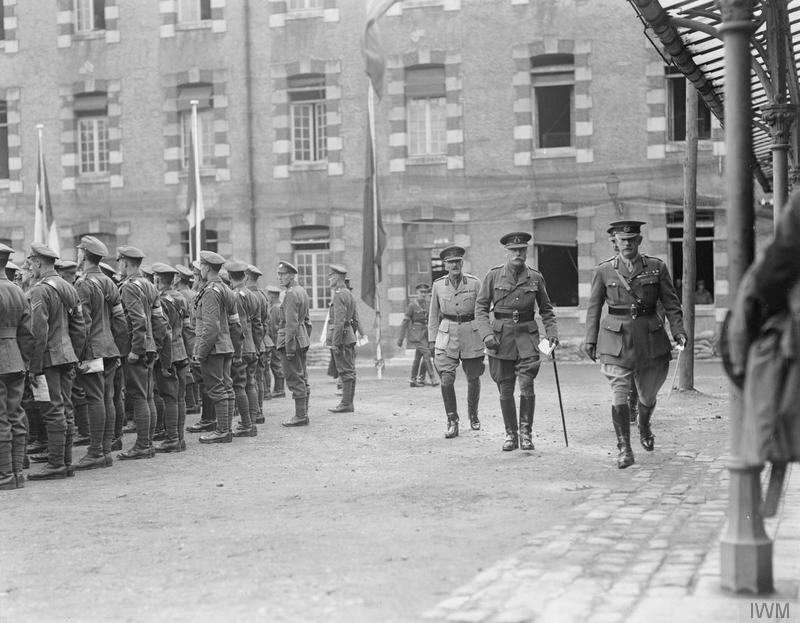
Field Marshal Haig attending service on the fourth anniversary of the declaration of war. Montreuil, France, 4 August 1918. Stood behind him is Lieutenant General Lawrence, his CGS.

Just three months later, Lawrence was promoted again, this time to temporary major general, and became General Officer Commanding (GOC) 52nd (Lowland) Infantry Division, another TF formation, at Gallipoli in September 1915 and during the evacuation at the end of 1915 he oversaw the withdrawal at Cape Helles beach.

He was promoted to major general on the Active List in November and, after being made a CB in June, to temporary lieutenant general in July 1916. In 1916 he returned to Egypt and achieved success at the Battle of Romani, but asked to be relieved of his command later in the year and was transferred to the 71st Home Service Division in England.

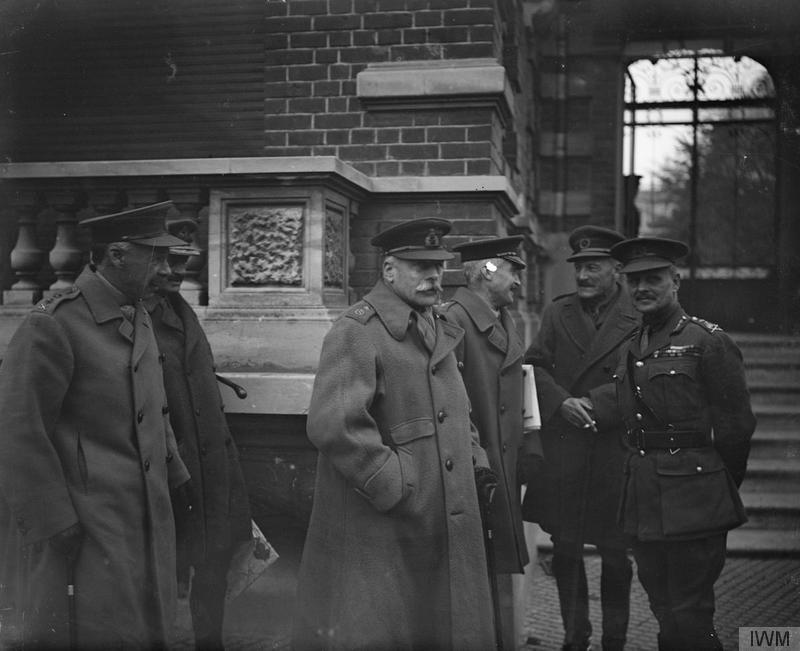
Field Marshal Haig and four of his army commanders at Cambrai, France, October 1918. Stood second from the right, holding a cigarette and talking to Lieutenant General Horne, is General Sir Herbert Lawrence.

In February 1917 he was in France as GOC of the 66th (2nd East Lancashire) Division, another TF formation, with whom he remained during the Battle of Passchendaele later in the year.

He served with the 66th until made chief intelligence officer on Haig's staff on 22 January 1918. He then took over from Sir Launcelot Kiggell as chief of the general staff of the BEF in France, for which he was granted the temporary rank of lieutenant general while holding the appointment. After being made a permanent lieutenant general in June, was promoted to full general, which in June 1919 was made permanent. He relinquished the post of CGS in April 1919.

== Postwar ==
Lawrence was made Knight Commander of the Order of the Bath in 1917 and Knight Grand Cross of the Order of the Bath in 1926. He also received, as well as other overseas honours, the Croix de Guerre, was made a Commander of the Order of the Star of Roumania in September 1919, and was made a Grand Officer of the Legion of Honour in 1919. He was awarded the Army Distinguished Service Medal, the citation for which reads:

The President of the United States of America, authorized by Act of Congress, July 9, 1918, takes pleasure in presenting the Army Distinguished Service Medal to Lieutenant General Herbert A. Lawrence, Royal British Army, for exceptionally meritorious and distinguished service in a position of great responsibility to the Government of the United States, during World War I. While serving as Chief of Staff, British Expeditionary Forces, General Lawrence rendered invaluable service to the American Expeditionary Forces and to the cause in which the United States has been engaged.

In 1919 he was given the colonelcy of the 21st (Empress of India's) Lancers, transferring after amalgamation to the 17th/21st Lancers, a position he held until 1938. From February 1925 to 1932 he was also colonel of the Manchester Regiment, taking over from Major General Sir Willoughby Gwatkin.

== Later life ==
After the war he was appointed as a member of the Royal Commission on the Coal Industry in 1925, a trustee of the Imperial War Graves Commission in 1926 and a governor of Wellington College. He became chairman of Vickers in 1926 and of Glyn's Bank in 1934. He was also chairman of several other banks and a director of a number of companies. He lived for some time in Dean's Place in Alfriston and later moved to Little Berkhamsted.

He died in 1943 and was buried at Seal, near Sevenoaks, Kent. He had married Isabel Mary Mills, the daughter of Charles Mills, 2nd Baron Hillingdon, in Sevenoaks in 1892. Their two sons, Oliver James Lawrence and Michael Charles Lawrence, were both killed in action during the First World War.

== Bibliography ==
- Harris, Paul (2019). General Sir Herbert Lawrence: Haig's Chief of Staff. Helion Limited, 2019. ISBN 9781911628873.

Military offices
Preceded by Granville Egerton	GOC 52nd (Lowland) Infantry Division; 1915–1916	Succeeded by Wilfrid Smith
Preceded by Charles Blomfield	GOC 66th (2nd East Lancashire) Division; February−December 1917	Succeeded by Neill Malcolm
