= Elgar Pagden =

English cricketer

Personal information
- Full name: Elgar Pagden
- Born: c. 1820; Alfriston, Sussex, England
- Died: 1883 (aged 62/63); Lancashire, England
- Batting: Unknown
- Relatives: James Pagden (brother); Hubert Pagden (grandson); Thomas Bellhouse (brother-in-law)

Career statistics
| Competition | First-class |
|---|---|
| Matches | 4 |
| Runs scored | 35 |
| Batting average | 5.83 |
| 100s/50s | –/– |
| Top score | 18 |
| Catches/stumpings | 2/– |
- Source: Cricinfo, 28 December 2019

Elgar Pagden (c. 1820 – 1883) was an English first-class cricketer.

The son of Henry Williams Pagden and Susannah Ade, he was born in 1820 at Alfriston, Sussex. He played first-class cricket for Manchester against Sheffield on four occasions between 1846 and 1848, scoring 35 runs with a high score of 18. He was employed by HM Customs and was married to Margaret Bellhouse, the sister of the cricketer Thomas Bellhouse, with the couple having six children. Pagden died in Lancashire in 1883. His brother, James, and grandson, Hubert, both played first-class cricket. His great-granddaughter was the South African anti-apartheid activist Molly Blackburn.
