= Thomas Bellhouse =

English cricketer

Personal information
- Full name: Thomas Taylor Bellhouse
- Born: 25 December 1818; Manchester, Lancashire, England
- Died: 9 June 1886 (aged 67); Sale, Cheshire, England
- Batting: Unknown
- Relatives: Richard Bellhouse (brother); Elgar Pagden (brother-in-law)

Career statistics
Competition	First-class
Matches	5
Runs scored	70
Batting average	10.00
100s/50s	–/–
Top score	28
Catches/stumpings	3/–
- Source: Cricinfo, 30 December 2019

Thomas Taylor Bellhouse (25 December 1818 – 9 June 1886) was an English first-class cricketer.

Born at Manchester in December 1818, Bellhouse was by profession a solicitor. He played first-class cricket for Manchester, making five appearances between 1846–54. He scored 70 runs in his five matches, with a high score of 28. He died at Sale in June 1886. His brother, Richard, was also a first-class cricketer, while his sister, Margaret, married the cricketer Elgar Pagden; through this marriage he is a distant relation to the South African anti-apartheid activist Molly Blackburn.
