= James Pagden =

English cricketer (c. 1814–1872)

Personal information
- Full name: James William Pagden
- Born: c. 1814; Jevington, Sussex, England
- Died: 28 December 1872; Alfriston, Sussex, England
- Relatives: Elgar Pagden (brother)

Domestic team information
- Years: Team
- 1835–1858: Sussex
- Source: CricketArchive

James William Pagden (c. 1814 – 28 December 1872) was an English cricketer who was active from 1835 to 1858 and played first-class cricket for Sussex, as well as being a prominent nineteenth-century beekeeper who invented the "Pagden method" of swarm control. His brother, Elgar Pagden, also played first-class cricket. He has also been credited with cutting the first Litlington White Horse, a hill figure in East Sussex.

== Family and early life ==
Pagden was born in Jevington, a small village in Sussex, c. 1814. He was a son of Henry William Pagden, a farmer at Frog Firle in Alfriston, and Susannah Ade. By the time of his younger brother Elgar's birth c. 1820, the family had settled in Alfriston.

Pagden married three times. His first marriage was on 25 September 1855 to his cousin Charlotte Pagden, daughter of Epsom brewer Trayton Peter Pagden. They had a son, Ernest Trayton Pagden (1857–1858), who died at one year old, shortly after Charlotte's own death in 1857. He married secondly Augusta Winstanley on 7 July 1859, with whom he had a son, Leonard Pagden (born 1862). Finally, he married Emma Tanner Sanger in 1866.

== Litlington White Horse ==
Pagden is credited with cutting the first Litlington White Horse, a chalk hill figure on Hindover Hill, overlooking the River Cuckmere in East Sussex, in 1836 or 1838, working with his two brothers and a cousin, William Ade of Milton Court Farm. The horse was reportedly cut to mark the coronation of Queen Victoria in 1838.

Two differing accounts survive of how the cutting came about. One tradition holds that the idea arose after Pagden and his companions took a boat trip along the River Cuckmere and climbed Hindover Hill for a picnic; when boredom set in, one of the party proposed cutting a horse into the hillside, having heard of a similar figure cut elsewhere, and the horse is said to have been marked out and finished within a single day. A separate account, recorded in 1925 from Peter Ade, grandson of William Ade, instead describes the cutting as a group effort on a Sunday, undertaken by young men and boys from Alfriston who were absent from church; Peter Ade recalled that the horse's creation "had no special significance" and was done simply "for the fun of the thing".

== Cricket career ==
A list of Marylebone Cricket Club (MCC) players active between 1827 and 1863 records a "J. W. Pagden" appearing for the club in 1830, several years before his recognised first-class debut; existing sources do not make clear whether this was a first-class or a minor appearance, and it is not reflected in the two-match first-class total generally attributed to him.

Pagden's recognised first-class career consisted of two matches for Sussex separated by an interval of twenty-three seasons: one in 1835, while Sussex was still organised as an ad hoc county eleven prior to the formal establishment of Sussex County Cricket Club in 1839, and a second in 1858. The List of Sussex County Cricket Club players records his appearance for the constituted county club under the year 1858, with the scorecard identifier "J. W. Pagden".

== Beekeeping ==
Pagden was also a prominent beekeeping-equipment manufacturer and supplier, and is credited as the originator of what became known as the "Pagden method" of swarm control, a technique still taught to beginner beekeepers and from which the modern "artificial swarm" procedure descends. He is reported to have taken up beekeeping around 1830 as a "skeppist", working with traditional straw skeps, and was the author of a booklet, £70 a Year: How I Make It by My Bees, first published in 1868 and reissued through nineteen editions; later editions were revised by his widow, Emma Pagden. His original method treated a colony after it had already swarmed, in contrast to the pre-emptive procedure now associated with his name.

== Death ==
Pagden died in Alfriston, Sussex, on 28 December 1872 and was buried six days later on 3 January 1873 in the family grave at St Andrew's Church, Alfriston.
