= Gerard of Bologna =

Italian theologian and saint (died 1317)

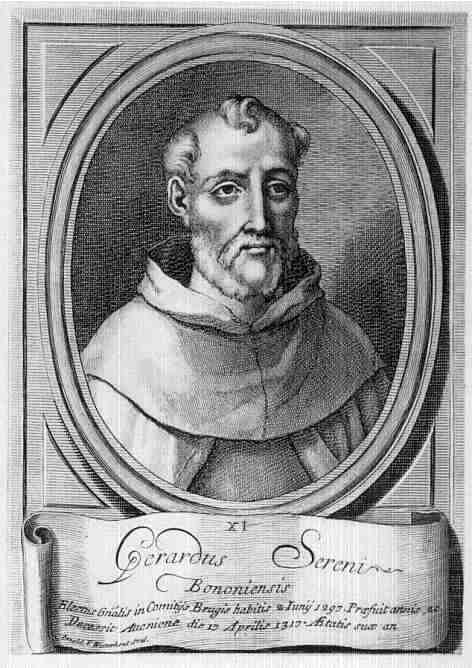
Gerardo Sereni

Gerard of Bologna (died 1317) was an Italian Carmelite theologian and scholastic philosopher.

A convinced Thomist, he took a doctorate in theology in 1295 at the University of Paris. Subsequently he was elected general of the Carmelite Order, in 1297.

== See also ==
- William of Littlington
