= Dean's Place Hotel =

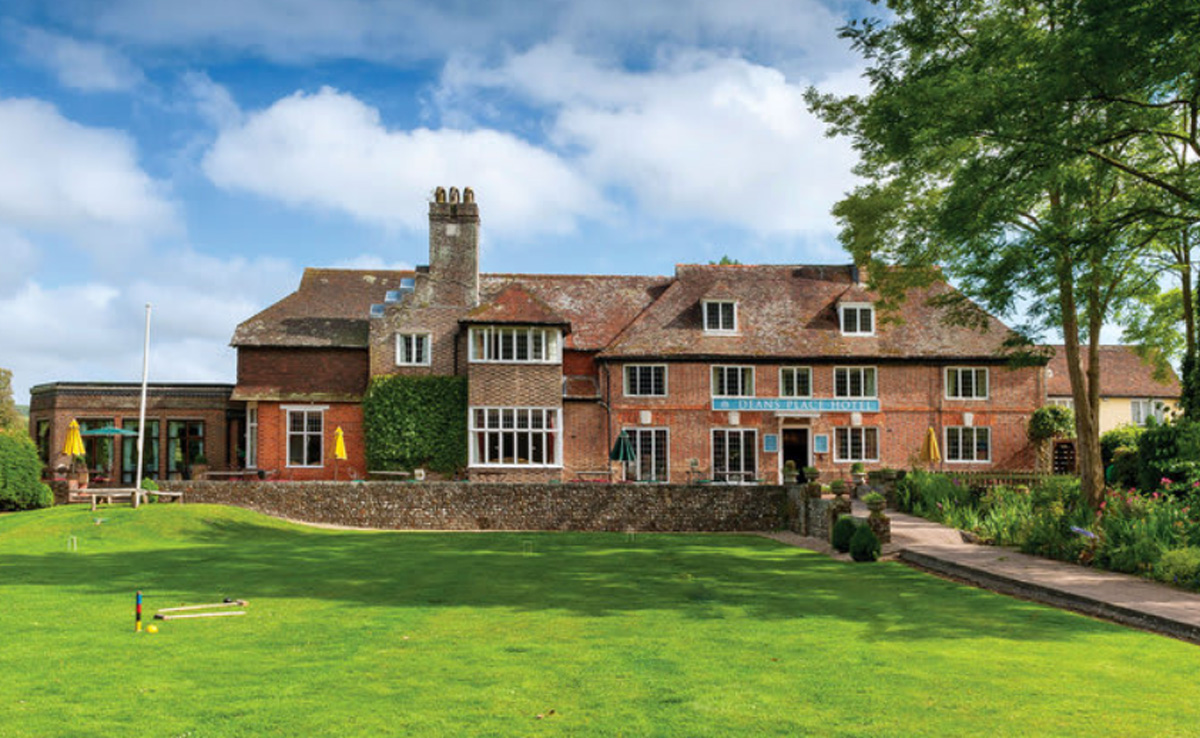

- Location within East Sussex
- 50°48′19″N 0°09′19″E
- Type: Country House
- Location: Alfriston
- OS grid reference: TQ 51970 02836

History
- Built: 17th Century

Site notes
- Area: East Sussex
- Owner: Steyne Hotels

Listed Building – Grade II
- Official name: Dean's Place Hotel
- Designated: 13 October 1952
- Reference no.: 1191372

Dean's Place in Alfriston, East Sussex is a building of historical significance and is a Grade II listed building. It was built in the 17th century or earlier and was the residence of several notable people over the next three hundred years. Today it is a hotel which provides restaurant facilities and caters for special events.

== Early owners ==
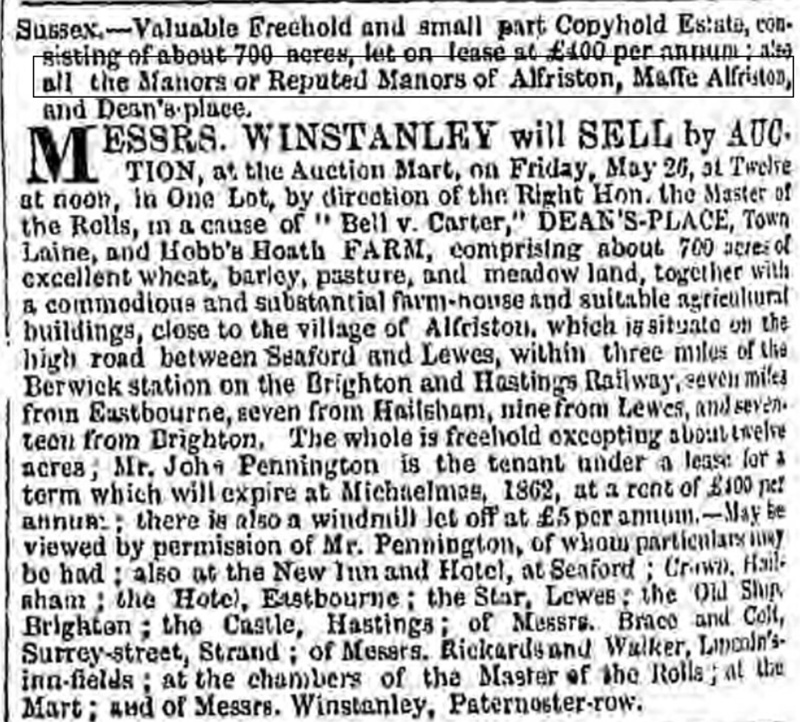
Sale notice in 1854

The earliest owners of the house were the Gyles family. They moved to the village in about 1580. The house is shown in the map of 1618 by John DeWard. The last member of this family was William Gyles. He left his property to his nephew William Batchelor who was the eldest son of his sister Elizabeth Gyles and her husband James Batchelor of Hastings.

William Batchelor lived at Alfriston with his wife Martha Gravely. They were married in Alfriston in 1726. When he died he left the property to his son William Batchelor. However he died two years later in a horse riding accident and as he had no closer heirs the house passed to his sister Mary Margaret Bachelor. She married Thomas Diamond in 1757; her eldest son was Joseph Diamond who subsequently inherited the property.

Joseph Diamond lived in Brenchley, Kent. He sold Dean's Place in about 1800 to Thomas Henry Harben.

Thomas Henry Harben was from the Harben family of Corsica Hall in Seaford. He was the son of Thomas Harben and Elizabeth Playstead. In 1790 he married Jane Durand. He sold Corsica Hall in 1812 and for some time lived at Dean's Place. In the 1822 the house was sold to Lieutenant Colonel John Henry Tilson (sometimes misspelt Tilston).

John Henry Tilson owned Watlington Park in Oxfordshire. He lived there until his death. When he died he left his property including Watlington Park and Dean's Place to his only surviving child Maria Susan Tilson. In 1842 she married Thomas Shaen Carter and the estates came under his ownership. The Tithe Map of 1843 records him as the owner. The couple retained ownership of Dean's Place until 1854 when it was advertised for sale. The advertisement is shown. At that time it was part of a large farming estate of over 700 acres.

== Later owners ==
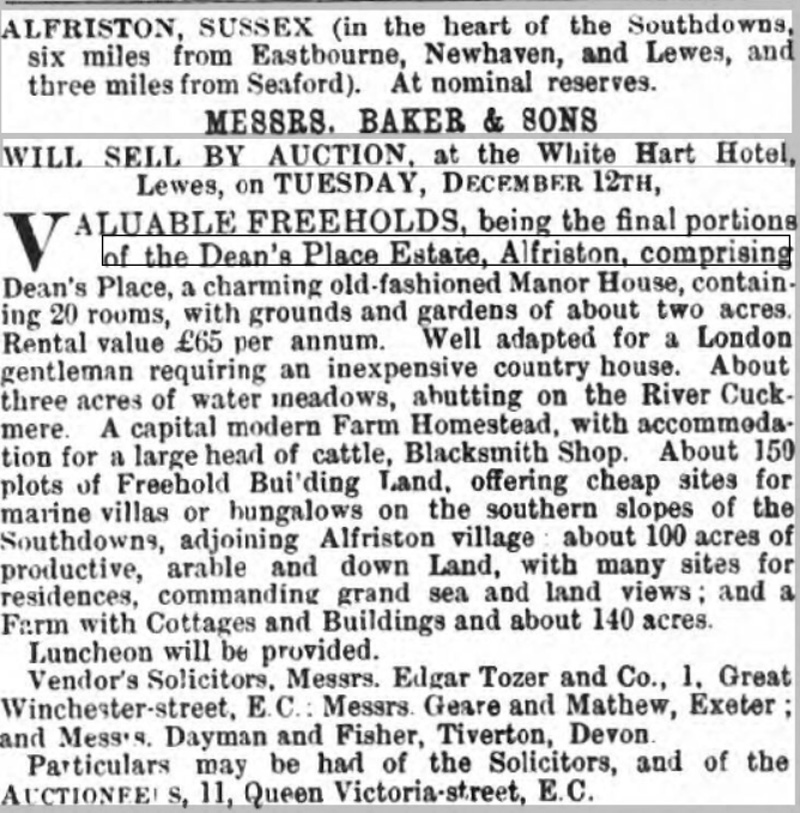
Sale notice in 1893

Dean's Place was again advertised for sale in 1871 and 1878 By about 1882 William Reynold Gade appears to be the owner of the property. He was married to Isabelle Julie Daelman and she inherited the house when he died. In 1893 she decided to sell the whole estate and a major sale was held. The property was subdivided into many lots and they were sold separately. The first sale was in June 1893 and was preceded by a sumptuous champagne luncheon. Dean's Place was advertised again in December 1893 and bought by Charles Goble Champion, a solicitor, who also owned property in Eastbourne. After his death the house was bought by General Sir Herbert Lawrence.

Sir Herbert Alexander Lawrence was the son of John Lawrence, 1st Baron Lawrence who, for some years, was the Viceroy of India. In 1892 he married Isabel Mary Mills who was the daughter of Charles Henry Mills, 1st Baron Hillingdon. After they bought Dean's Place they commissioned the famous architect Walter Godfrey to conduct restoration work on the house, which was completed in 1923. The couple lived intermittently at Dean's Place until 1935 when they sold it and moved to Woodcock Lodge in Little Berkhamsted. In 1936 an application was approved by the Hailsham Rural District Council to convert the property to a residential hotel.
