= Richard Bellhouse =

English cricketer, watercolourist, and architect

Personal information
- Full name: Richard Taylor Bellhouse
- Born: 9 May 1825; Manchester, Lancashire, England
- Died: 7 December 1906 (aged 81); Lower Weston, Somerset, England
- Batting: Unknown
- Bowling: Unknown
- Relatives: Thomas Bellhouse (brother)

Domestic team information
- Years: Team
- 1849–1851: Lancashire

Career statistics
Competition	First-class
Matches	15
Runs scored	240
Batting average	8.57
100s/50s	–/–
Top score	40
Balls bowled	20
Wickets	1
Bowling average	7.00
5 wickets in innings	–
10 wickets in match	–
Best bowling	1/7
Catches/stumpings	8/–
- Source: Cricinfo, 2 April 2019

Richard Taylor Bellhouse (9 May 1825 – 7 December 1906) was an English first-class cricketer, watercolourist and architect.

Bellhouse was born at Manchester. He made his debut in first-class cricket for Manchester against Sheffield at Sheffield. He played in first-class matches for Manchester against Sheffield on ten occasions between 1846 and 1854, including on three occasions when the matches were billed as Lancashire v Yorkshire in 1849 and 1851. He appeared in a first-class match for the Gentlemen of England against the Gentlemen of the Marylebone Cricket Club at Lord's in 1853, as well as appearing in two North v South for the North in 1855 and 1856. He played for Manchester against Sussex in 1858, before making a final first-class appearance for Gentlemen of the North against the Gentlemen of the South at The Oval in 1859. Across fifteen first-class matches, Bellhouse scored 240 runs at an average of 8.57, with a high score of 40.

Outside of cricket he worked as an architect and a watercolour artist. He was responsible for designing the grandstand at Knutsford Racecourse. He died at Weston in Bath in December 1906, where he was buried at Locksbrook Weston Cemetery. His brother, Thomas Bellhouse, also played first-class cricket.
