= Litlington White Horse =

Chalk hill figure on Hindover Hill in East Sussex

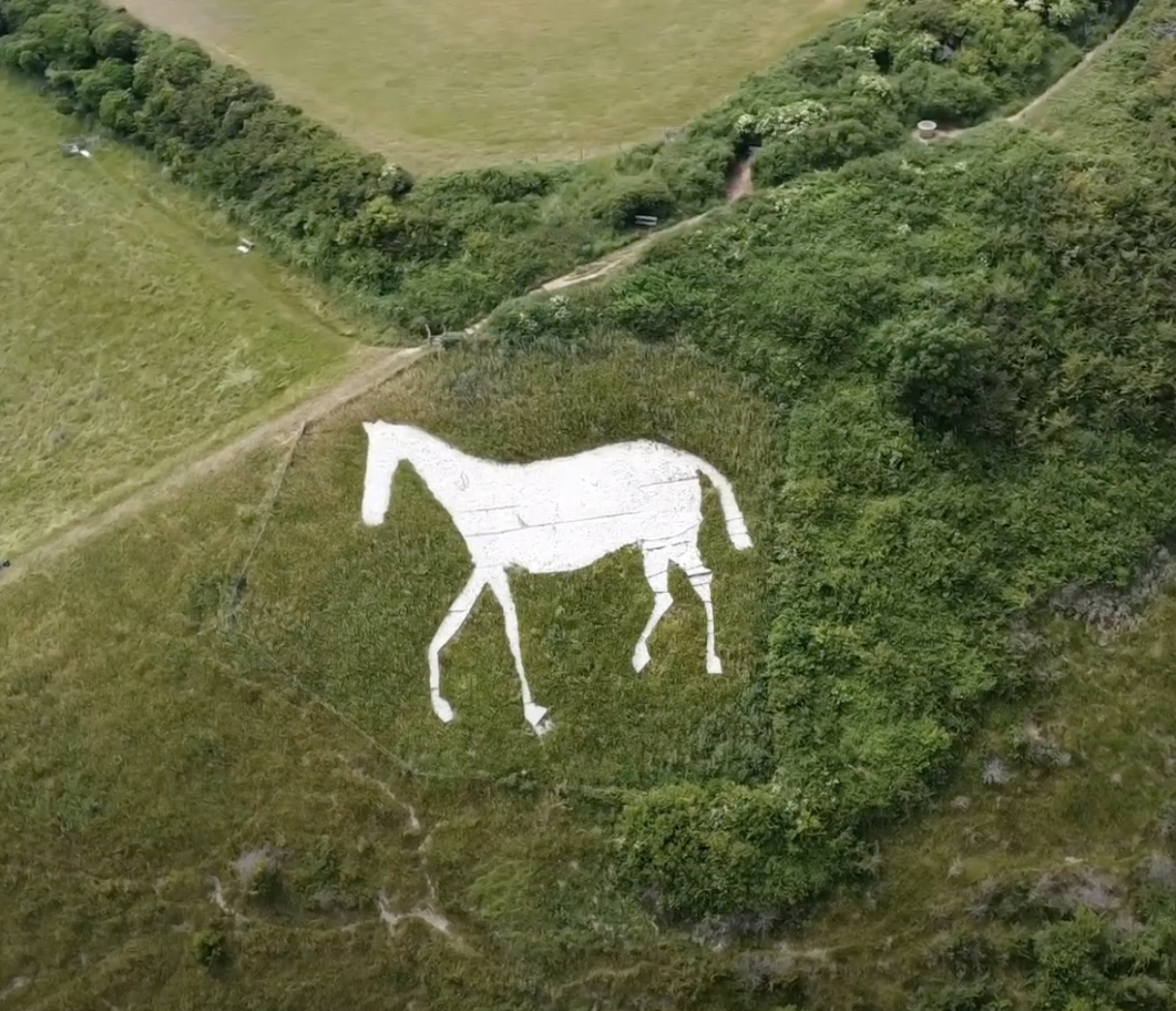
- Second Litlington White Horse, cut in 1924

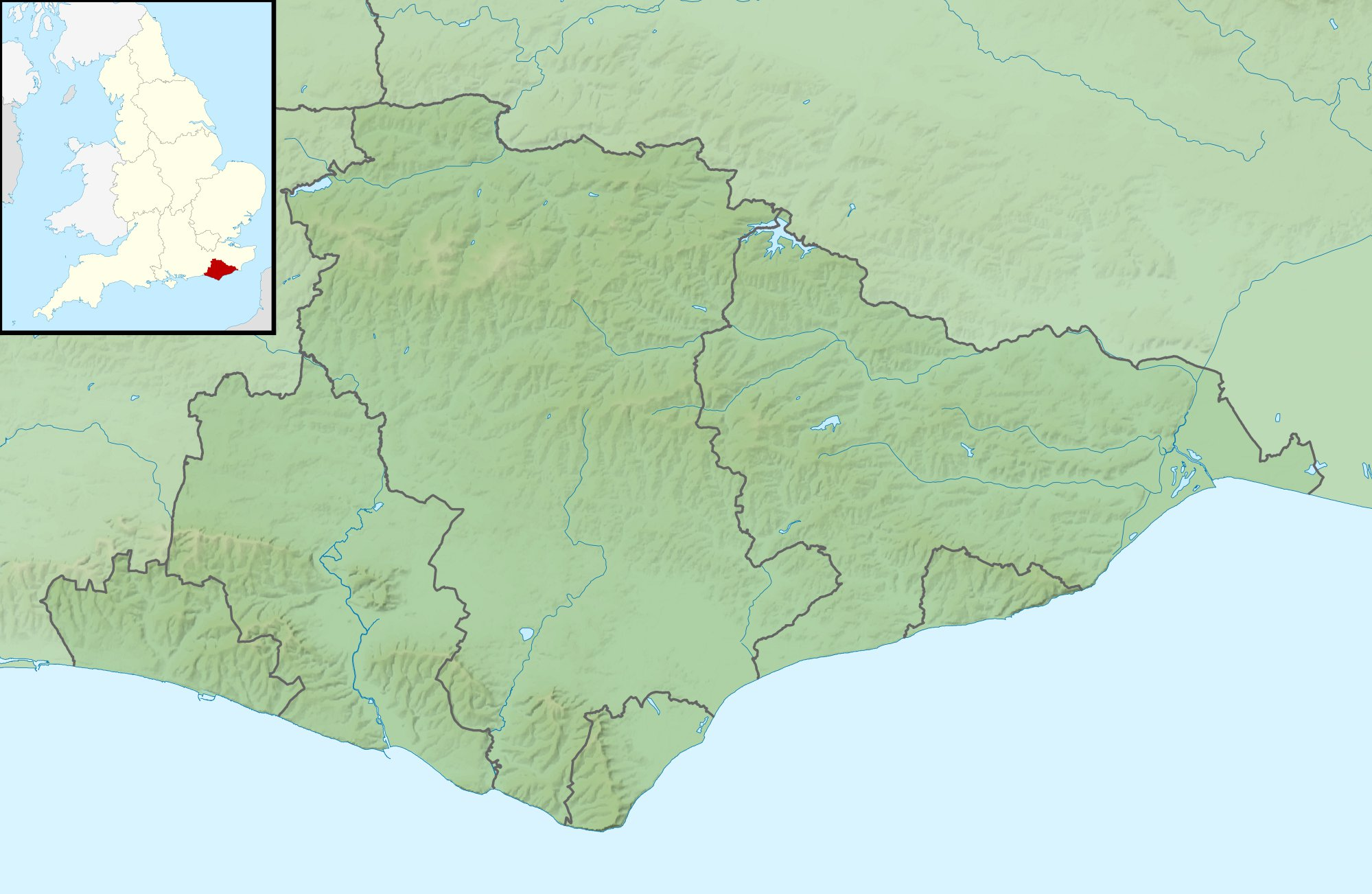
- Litlington White Horse in East Sussex
- Location: Hindover Hill, Litlington, East Sussex, England
- Coordinates: 50.788106°N 0.142031°E
- Designer: James Pagden (first horse), John T. Ade (second horse)
- Type: Hill figure
- Material: Chalk
- Length: 28 m (92 ft)
- Height: 20 m (66 ft)
- Beginning date: 1836 or 1838 (first horse), 1923 (second horse)
- Completion date: 1836 or 1838 (first horse), 20 February 1924 (second horse)
- Dedicated date: 1838 commemoration of Queen Victoria's coronation (first horse)
- Restored date: 1924 (re-cutting), 1949, 1980s, 1991–present (ongoing maintenance)
- Website: Litlington White Horse
- Ownership: National Trust

The Litlington White Horse is a chalk hill figure depicting a prancing horse, located on the Eastern slope of Hindover Hill (locally known as High-and-Over) in the South Downs of East Sussex, England. Situated near the villages of Litlington and Alfriston, it overlooks the River Cuckmere and is one of only two surviving hill figures in the county, alongside the Long Man of Wilmington. It is one of only a few prominent English chalk horses located outside Wiltshire.

The present figure was cut in February 1924 by local farmer John T. Ade and two companions over the course of a single night. Measuring approximately 28 m (92 ft) in length and 20 m (66 ft) in height, the horse is notable for its dynamic prancing posture, a design choice adopted during 1980s conservation work to prevent erosion on the steep 45-degree slope. Since 1991, the site has been owned and maintained by the National Trust, which conducts regular scouring to preserve the figure's visibility against the encroaching turf.

The 1924 horse replaced an earlier figure on the same hillside, cut in either 1836 or 1838 by James Pagden, a first-class cricketer for Sussex and renowned beekeeper, to supposedly commemorate the coronation of Queen Victoria. The original horse, which featured a more traditional standing pose, fell into neglect and was largely overgrown by the early 20th century.

In addition to the white horse, Hindover Hill is the subject of local folklore concerning several lost chalk figures, including a "Giant" or "Lady" often compared to the Long Man of Wilmington, and a large white cross. Today, the horse remains a prominent cultural landmark, appearing in local art, literature, and even as the solution to the 1980s real-world treasure hunt game Pimania.

== Toponymy ==
Until the late 20th century, the Litlington White Horse was known by several different names reflecting its location and nearby landmarks. The most prominent of these were the "High and Over White Horse" and the "Sussex White Horse", though it was also frequently referred to as the "White Horse on Hindover Hill", the "Alfriston White Horse", the "Charleston White Horse", the "Exceat White Horse",the "Cuckmere White Horse", and the "Jevington White Horse". Today, the name "Litlington White Horse" is the most widely used, despite the figure being physically situated within the parish of Alfriston rather than Litlington.

The figure is located on Hindover Hill, which is locally known as "High-and-Over." Historically, the hill's name has also been recorded as 'Hinover' and 'Hineover', with 'High-and-Over' likely originating as a folk etymology of the older 'Hindover'.

== First Litlington White Horse ==
The First Litlington White Horse formed part of a wider trend in the 19th and early 20th centuries, during which several communities across southern England created or restored chalk figures as enduring symbols of local identity, pride, and heritage.

=== Creation and early history ===
The first White Horse was designed and cut by James Pagden (1814-1872), the son of Henry William Pagden (1780-1847), a tenant farmer at Frog Firle Farm. He created the hill figure alongside two of his three teenage brothers, Elgar Pagden (1820-1883), Charles Henry Pagden (1817-1882) or Alfred Pagden (1821-1870), and their younger cousin, William Ade (1820–1892) of Milton Court Farm (in the nearby hamlet of Milton Street), reportedly to commemorate the coronation of Queen Victoria. James was a first-class cricketer for Sussex, and a prominent 19th-century beekeeper who invented the "Pagden method" of swarm control, first described in his booklet £70 a Year: How I Make It by My Bees (1868).

Local legend claims that work on the horse began after the farmers' sons took a boat trip along the River Cuckmere and climbed Hindover Hill for a picnic. When boredom set in, one of the boys proposed cutting a horse hill figure, inspired by a similar one he had heard about elsewhere, as a way to celebrate Queen Victoria's coronation in June. According to this account, the horse was cut on the spur of the moment and completed in a single day.

A 1925 account by Peter Ade, grandson of William Ade, provides additional detail, suggesting that the cutting took place on a Sunday, with a group of young men and boys from Alfriston, absent from church, participating in the creation of the figure. Ade also remarked that the horse's creation "had no special significance" and was undertaken simply "for the fun of the thing". It is also believed that William Ade's father, Charles Ade, who had surveying experience, may have contributed to the planning of the figure.

While the authorship of the figure is well attested, its precise date is less certain, with accounts placing the cutting in either 1836 or 1838. Numerous records from the 1850s and 1860s support the 1836 or 1838 date for the horse's creation.

The Hackpen White Horse in Wiltshire is frequently identified as a "sister horse" to the First Litlington figure. Beyond sharing a creation date to commemorate the coronation of Queen Victoria, both figures featured a similar design aesthetic, characterised by a traditional standing pose and broadly comparable proportions.

A commonly repeated alternative claim holds that the horse was cut in 1860 by two local boys who, noticing a patch of exposed chalk resembling a horse's head, decided to cut away the rest of the figure to complete the outline. This is better understood as a misconception arising from a later episode: rather than creating the horse, the boys are likely to have recut it around 1860 after a period of neglect, working from the surviving outline of the head. This would explain the overgrowth on parts of the body and the resulting confusion over the figure's date of creation.

=== Design and location ===
Few contemporary accounts describe the first horse’s design. One report, written after a visit in 1884, noted its prominent "mane, eyes, and nose" as well as "two donkey's ears". Another account from 1925 compared it with the Second Litlington White Horse, describing the original as resembling "the thickest farm horse", in contrast to the "racy" appearance of the later figure.

Although its exact size is not recorded, beyond being described as "gigantic" in a 1925 account, a faint photograph from the late 1910s suggests the figure was significantly larger than the present horse and depicted in a standing position with straight legs, consistent with most other chalk horse figures.

Although some have suggested that the first horse stood around 100 yards north-west of the current figure, photographs of Hindover Hill from the late 1910s show its faint outline in roughly the same position as the present-day horse.

=== Maintenance and neglect ===
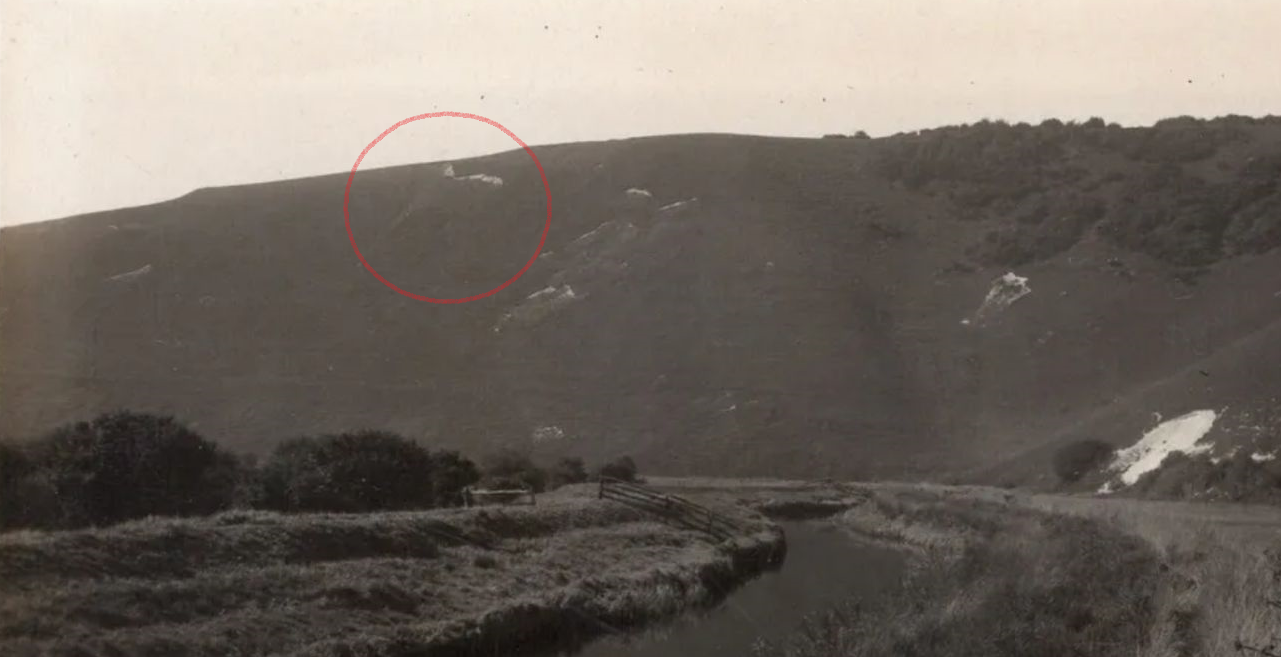
First Litlington White Horse late 1910s (outlined in red)

Over time, the first white horse fell into disrepair. Unlike the modern figure cut in 1924, which consists of deep excavations backfilled with layers of chalk, the 1838 horse was likely only created by simply removing the turf to reveal the chalk beneath. Without the depth of a rock-filled trench, such figures are significantly more vulnerable to rapid overgrowth and "soil creep" (the downward movement of topsoil).

By the early 1860s, the roughness of the horse’s outline was frequently remarked upon. In 1862, one observer described it as "a piece of rustic sculpture", suggesting that the recutting and upkeep carried out during this period were not of the same quality as the original cutting in 1838. By 1892, it was reported that the horse’s “edges have of late unfortunately broken away, and the figure become almost shapeless”. It was further reported in 1898 that the figure had become "a very rough cutting resembling a horse", and that its maintenance had become a traditional activity for local youths, passed down through generations.

References to the horse throughout the mid- to late 1800s indicate that it was maintained, though with varying levels of care, until around 1900, when neglect set in. By 1908, one account remarked that “all traces have now perished” as “the usual periodical scourings” had ceased, and by the early 1910s, the figure was reported as entirely overgrown. An additional account from the early 1930s claimed that the horse 'was destroyed by rabbits that burrowed into it at such length it had become almost obliterated”. The last recorded sighting of the first figure was in 1924, when it "could be made out, though with difficulty" due to heavy overgrowth.

== Second Litlington White Horse ==
Interest in the First Litlington White Horse was reignited in the early 20th century, sparking efforts to revive its tradition and preserve its historical significance. The 1924 carving is widely regarded as both a restoration of the first figure and a reimagined design, created to honour and celebrate the enduring legacy of the horse on Hindover Hill.

=== Creation and cutting ===
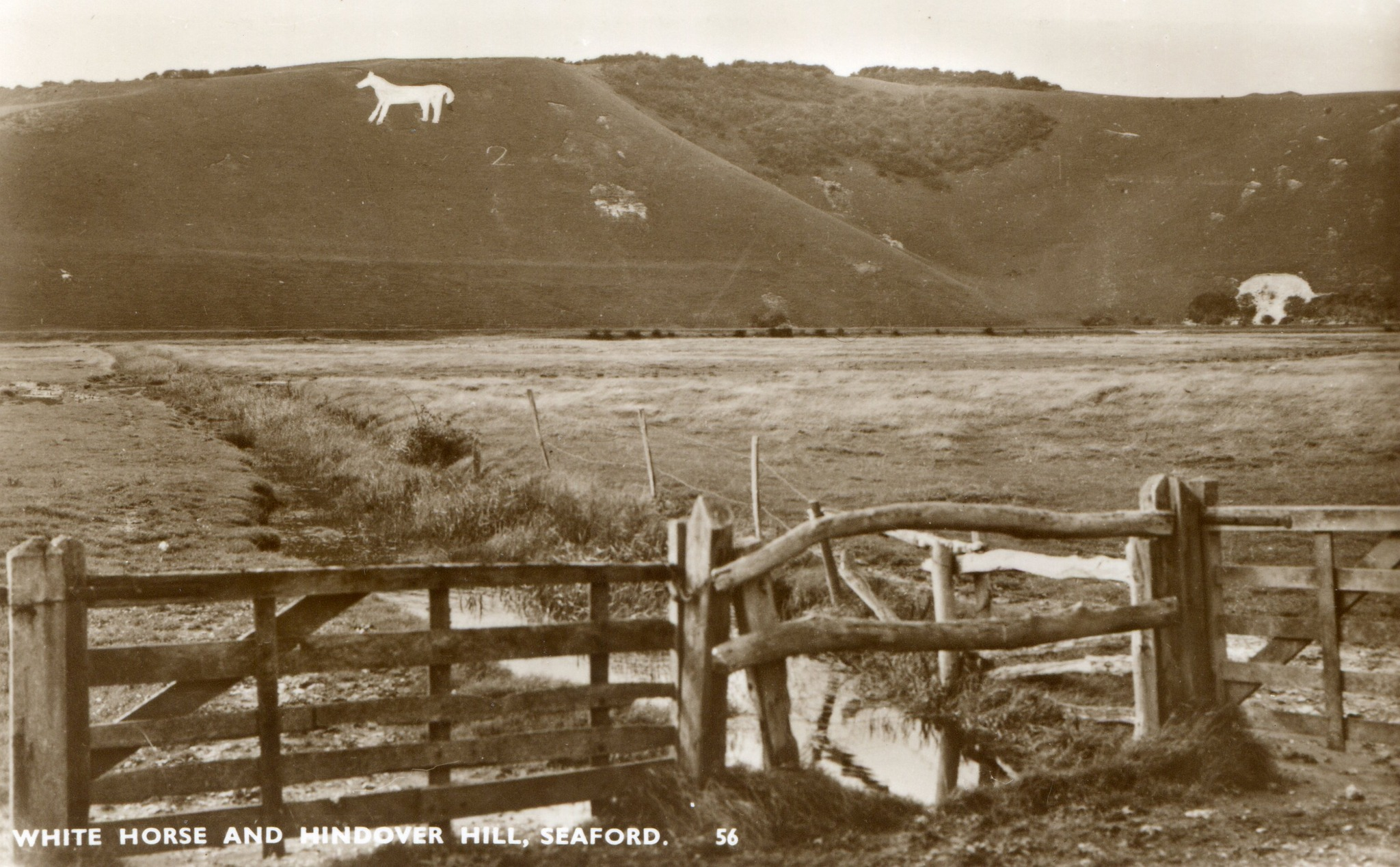
Litlington White Horse before 1940

The second horse was designed and cut by local farmer John T Ade (1890-1952) of Grove Hill Farm in Hellingly, the grandson of William Ade one of the cutters of the first horse, alongside two of his friends, Eric W Hobbis (1883-1949), a market gardener from Long Ashton near Bristol who was lodging at Grove Hill Farm while working at Bears Orchard in Magham Down and Stephen Bovis (1876-1967) who was Farm Manager at Grove Hill Farm, during a single night between 7 pm and 5 am during the full moon of 20 February 1924 on a 45 degree slope. There are two differing accounts of when the idea to recut the horse was first conceived. One version claims that John shared the story of his father’s original carving of the horse in 1838 during a late evening at a pub in the nearby village of Alfriston, where he, Hobbis and Bovis hatched a plan to recreate the figure under cover of darkness. The other suggests the conversation took place while the group was traveling along Litlington Road below Hindover Hill, where John Ade pointed out the site to his companions before they resolved to restore the horse. Originally designed by John Ade during the winter of 1923, he drew inspiration for his design from the Westbury White Horse in Wiltshire, alongside a picture he had of the First Litlington White Horse. John Ade suggested his inspiration in cutting the horse was based on both the history of the First Litlington White Horse cut by his grandfather and the story of the Kilburn White Horse in North Yorkshire.

According to John T Ade, they first laid out the horse using ropes and pegs in the House Field at Ade's Grove Hill Farm in the nearby village of Hellingly in preparation for its cutting in Litlington. The original drawing created by John Ade to assist with the horse's cutting is minutely annotated to give the distance between each peg and the next to ensure the accuracy of the design's transfer. During the February full moon on a cold and frosty night, the men cut the horse using a 'stick' of 35 inches as a measurement for a quick transfer of their design. They arrived at the site around 7 pm, working throughout the night and finished the cutting at around 5 am the following morning, giving them just enough time to get back home and milk the cows before any suspicion of their absence was raised. The horse was cut without permission and without the knowledge of the local residents, who were startled by the horse's sudden appearance on the hillside. This may have been the motivation behind the speedy cutting. The unusual design of the horse, especially the original differing positions of its front and rear legs, drew attention for its peculiar composition. In 1931, it was described as "whereas its hind legs move, its forelegs refuse to."

=== Wartime camouflage and 1949 restoration ===
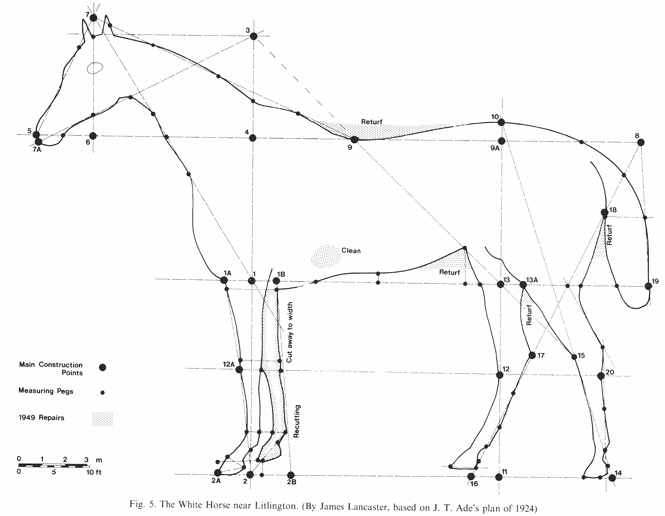
The Litlington White Horse design and 1949 repairs (by James Lancaster, based on J. T. Ade’s plan of 1924)

In 1939–40, the Litlington White Horse was deliberately covered, on orders from the Air Ministry and carried out by the Ministry of Home Security, to prevent it from being used as a location marker for the Luftwaffe during World War II, after maps featuring hill figures were found on captured German aircrew. The rushed uncovering of the horse in 1945 by War Office contractors resulted in several changes to the horse's original shape, including only one front leg being recut.

This was not corrected until the full moon of 9 June 1949, when between 10 pm and 3 am, two of the original cutters, John Ade and Stephen Bovis, both now elderly (Eric Hobbis had moved away), alongside their friend Paul Harris a local builder's merchant, made several changes to return the horse to its 1924 appearance. These changes included recutting an additional front leg and readjusting the back, which "had shifted uphill a bit from saddle to rump". Ade suggested the difficulty of the repair: turf had to be filled in, loose chalk rolled down where people walked or slipped, and it was hard to judge exact positions and measurements on the hillside. He only felt the result was satisfactory after viewing it a few days later from the Litlington road.

=== 1980s re-profiling ===
The restoration of the White Horse in the 1980s was a pivotal effort to preserve the figure’s visibility and structural integrity. Notably, in 1983, the East Sussex County Council, in collaboration with the British Trust for Conservation Volunteers, undertook significant work to maintain and enhance the figure. From 17 to 23 September of that year, wooden boards were installed around the horse to secure the structure. This project, sponsored by Prudential plc, also included terracing the legs and body with revetment boarding to reduce the gradient and ensure the chalk would remain in place. Additionally, a perimeter fence was erected to prevent livestock damage.

A notable change during this period was the alteration of the horse's posture. Originally standing, the horse's position was adjusted to a ‘prancing’ stance to prevent the chalk rubble used in its construction from slipping and to reduce the risk of the legs acting as natural water channels. This had previously caused the unpredictable elongating and splaying of the hooves after heavy rainfall. This adjustment resulted in the horse taking its current form. Workers on the hill communicated with observers in the valley below via a two-way radio system to direct these changes.

=== National Trust stewardship and continued maintenance ===
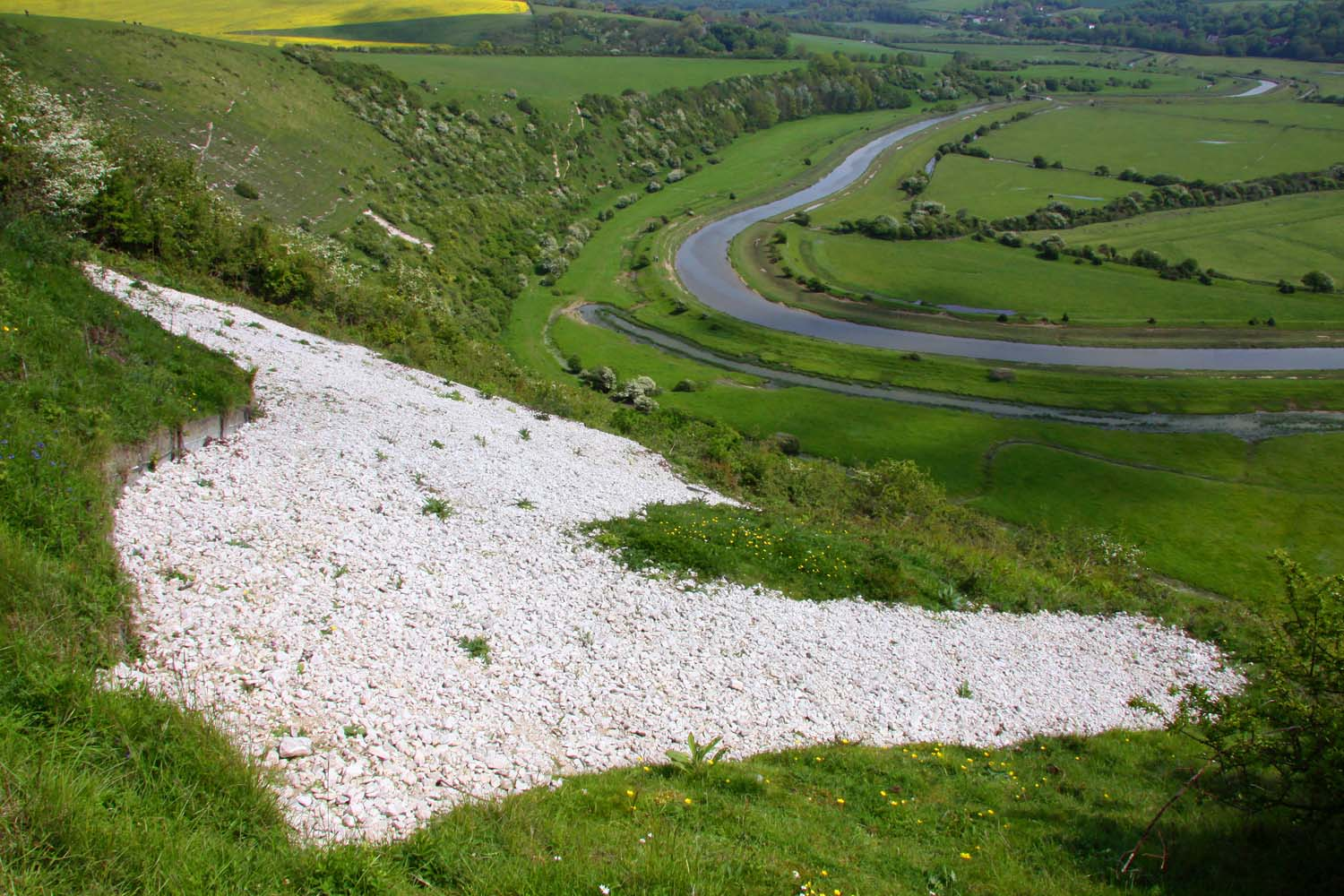
Looking across the Cuckmere Valley from the horse

In 1991, Frog Firle Farm, along with the White Horse situated in its grounds, was acquired by the National Trust. Further restoration followed in the summer of 1993, a project which occupied some ten workers for about ten days. During this effort, volunteers reinforced the outline with white revetment boarding held by iron pegs, carrying approximately 30 cubic metres (22.95 square yards) of clean chalk to the figure by hand basket and wheelbarrow. To ensure stability, the pegs were wired and stapled to the boards, and additional pegs were used to hold large lumps of chalk until they were shattered by frost. Following the structural work, the team undertook further work to wire down turves and reseed the bare ground outside the figure to restore the surrounding hillside.

The horse is protected by stock-fencing to keep livestock away and deter visitors from walking on the figure, which can cause significant damage; the lower fence also serves to catch occasional chalk boulders that may roll down the slope. In 2016, maintenance of the horse saw 6 tonnes of chalk being spread over the figure. From 2022 to 2026, the figure was part of Changing Chalk, a landscape-scale partnership led by the National Trust and funded by the National Lottery Heritage Fund, which grew to 13 partner organisations, including the South Downs National Park Authority and Historic England, in which volunteers were trained to monitor and preserve scheduled historic sites including the White Horse.

In recent years, technology has played a role in the preservation of the Litlington White Horse. Techniques such as aerial drone photography and digital mapping have been used to monitor its condition. As part of its maintenance, care is taken to minimise environmental impact; chalk used for restoration is often sourced locally to ensure consistency and protect the surrounding grassland and its biodiversity. As a significant local landmark, the horse has been subject to several acts of vandalism, which necessitate physical repairs. In May 2017, it was vandalised with the addition of a unicorn horn, which was quickly removed.

=== Design and location ===
The horse is situated on a 45-degree slope and measures around 28 m (92 ft) in length and 20 m (66 ft) in height. Along with the Devizes White Horse (cut in 1999), it is one of only two horse hill figures in the UK depicted in a prancing posture, a design adopted during restoration in 1983. When visiting the horse in 1949, Morris Marples described it as having "two ears and a long, flowing tail, but lacking both an eye and nostril".

== Geology and ecology ==
The figure is cut into the Eastern flank of Hindover Hill, which consists of Seaford Chalk, a firm white bedrock noted for its large flint nodules. The overlying soil is a Rendzina, a thin, alkaline layer typical of the South Downs. Because this soil profile encourages rapid encroachment by turf and scrub, the horse requires regular scouring to prevent natural reclamation.

The chalk hillside where the Litlington White Horse is situated is not just a cultural landmark but also an ecological one. The South Downs, of which Hindover Hill is a part, hosts a unique chalk grassland ecosystem. The maintenance of the horse indirectly supports the preservation of this habitat, as regular clearing of the figure helps prevent the spread of invasive species and promotes the growth of native chalk grassland flora.

== Lost hill figures on Hindover Hill ==
=== The Giant of Hindover Hill ===
The Giant of Hindover Hill is a lost chalk hill figure that is said to have once appeared alongside the First Litlington White Horse on the side of Hindover Hill. There are some references to the figure throughout the 19th century, though descriptions provide brief detail regarding its origins, design, or longevity. By the 1930s, mentions of the giant had ceased, and its potential existence faded from public memory.

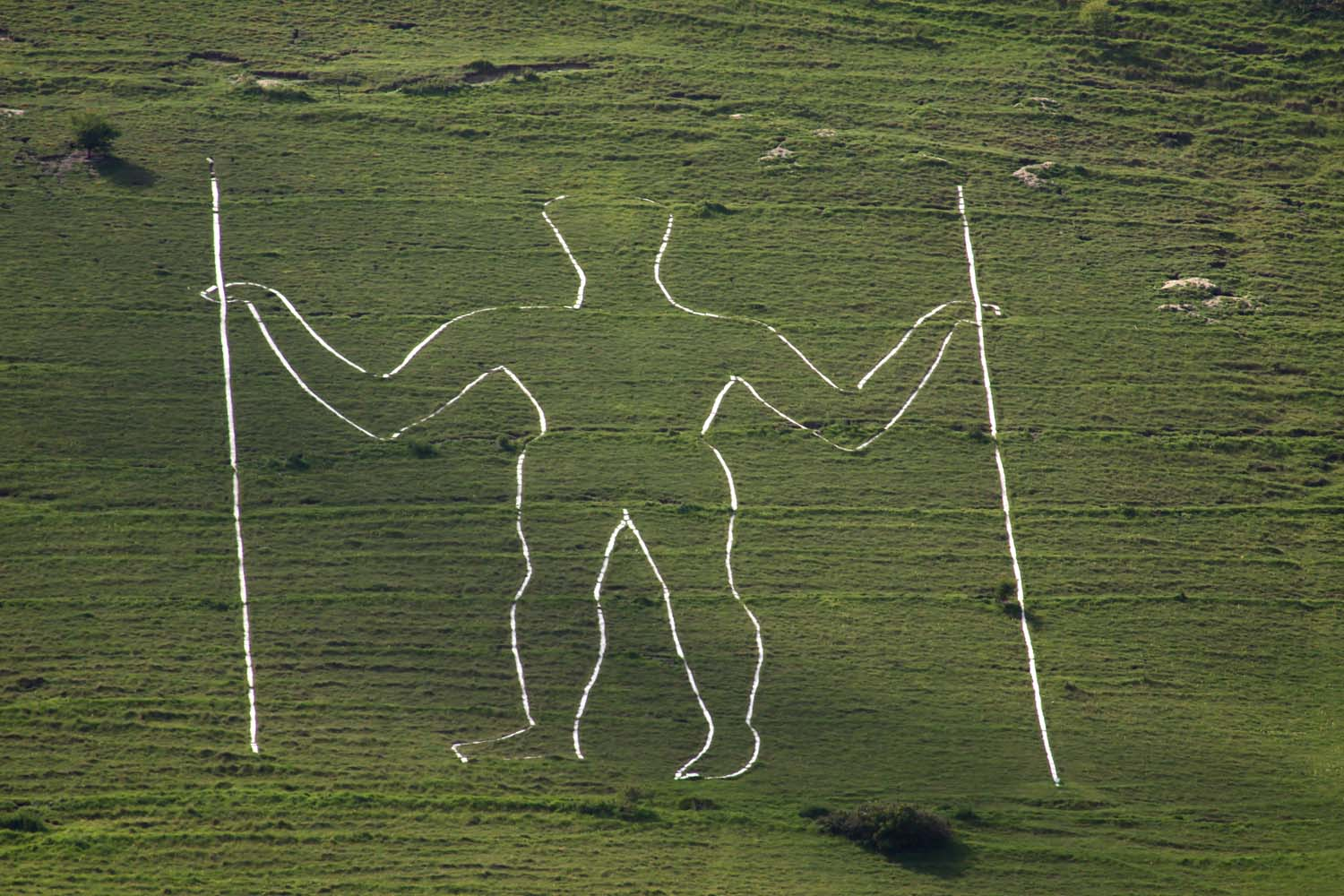
The Long Man of Wilmington, situated 3 miles north-east of Hindover

Historian Rodney Castleden suggests that Hindover Hill was once home to a giant figure similar to the Long Man of Wilmington, which has since disappeared. Jacqueline Simpson supports this theory, noting that until the early 19th century, the figures on Hindover Hill and Wilmington were collectively referred to as "Adam and Eve." Although one account from 1895 refers only to the figure on Hindover Hill as the "Adam and Eve and the White Horse".

Further context is provided by Philip Carr-Gomm, who recounts tales of a tall female giant, described as a goddess, believed to have been carved into the chalk on Hindover Hill. An account from 1893, detailing the restoration of the Long Man of Wilmington, states: "Near Wilmington is another hill, Hindover Hill, also sharply precipitous, and on this there are large figures of a horse and a lady cut in the white chalk centuries ago."

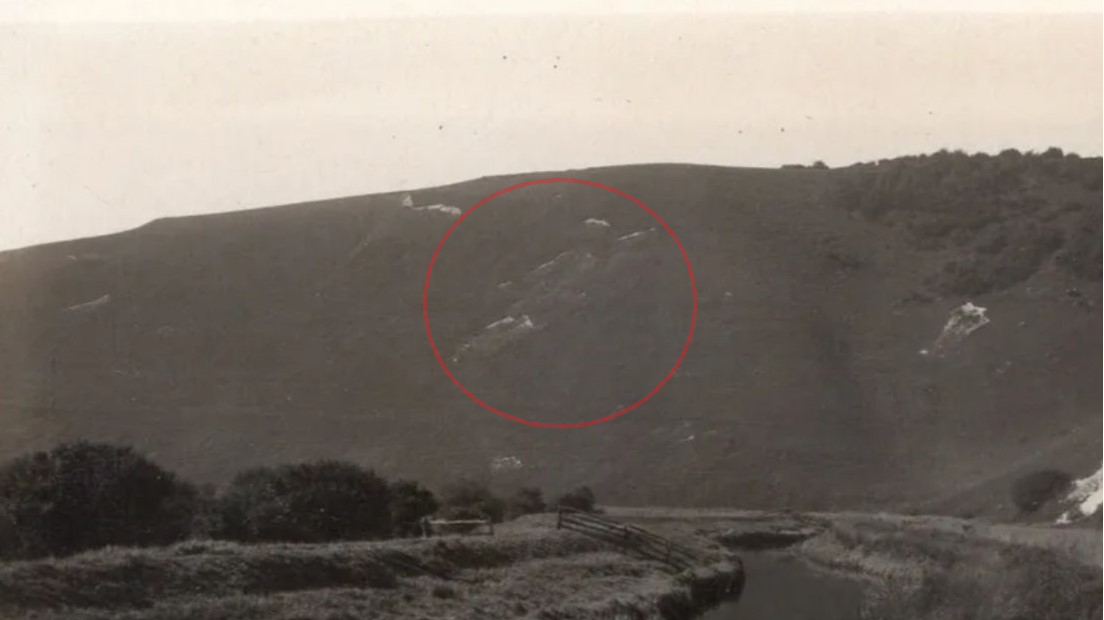
Photograph from the late 1910s with a red outline indicating the reported location of the Giant of Hindover Hill.

In 1905, John Philipps Emslie recorded a local oral tradition describing a male figure carved into Hindover Hill. According to this story, the carving depicted "a man being thrown from a horse," commemorating an Anglo-Saxon victory over the Normans. A. H. Allcroft summarised various accounts of the figure, noting: "Men who were schoolboys in the 1860s recollect it well enough, though it is now so vanished that learned folks refuse to believe it."

By 1923, one report stated that "the Hindover Hill horse and man have completely disappeared in fifty years." By the late 19th century, the figure had faded to such an extent that its existence was called into question. While no physical traces remain to confirm its existence, historical accounts suggest that the purported figure's decline coincided with the end of maintenance on the first Litlington White Horse in the late 19th century.

=== White cross ===
Several mid-19th-century accounts of the Litlington White Horse mentioned a large cross cut into the chalk alongside the horse on Hindover Hill. An 1865 account refers to the figures as "the cross and white horse". However, by the 1890s, accounts of the horse failed to mention the cross. The reason why the horse continued to be maintained while the cross was neglected remains unknown.

=== Other hill figures ===
During the late 1920s and 1930s, there were accounts of a large letter "S" and an irregular shape resembling a lion's head cut into the chalk below the second white horse. However, no further mention of these figures can be found after the mid-1930s. If these markings were man-made, their short existence suggests they were not maintained.

== Folklore ==
Oral histories passed down through generations of local families weave together rich details about the original figure, blending fact with folklore and adding layers of myth and legend to the horse's history.

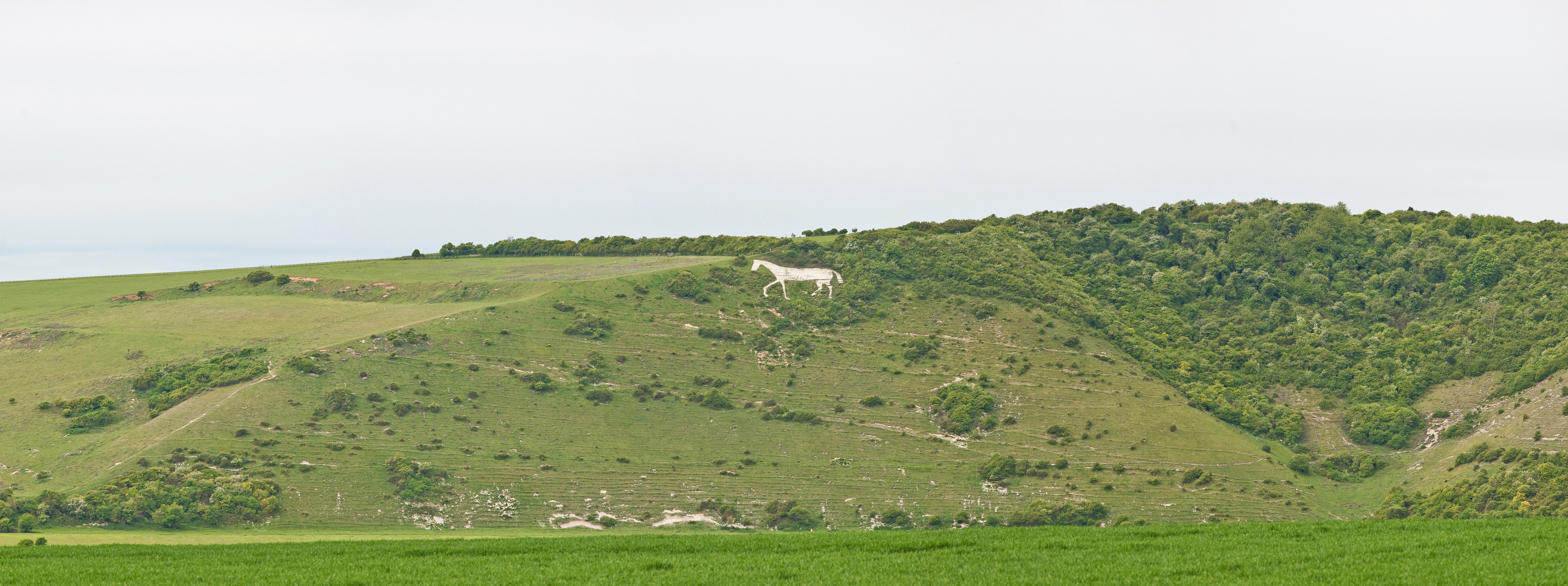
Hindover Hill, including the Second White Horse

One local tale suggests that the horse was originally cut as a memorial to a local girl whose horse bolted while she was riding along the brow of Hindover Hill, resulting in her fatal fall. A similar story claims the horse commemorates a woman riding down Hindover Hill on a white horse when the animal slipped and fell, leading to their deaths. However, there is no evidence to support either of these accounts.

Another story suggests that the hill figure originally depicted a dog, carved by a grieving boy to mark the grave of his pet, which had been killed either alongside or in the River Cuckmere below. Over time, erosion allegedly caused the figure to change shape, eventually resembling a horse in its current form. This story, like the others, lacks supporting evidence.

== Influence and cultural references ==
=== Symbolism and local identity ===
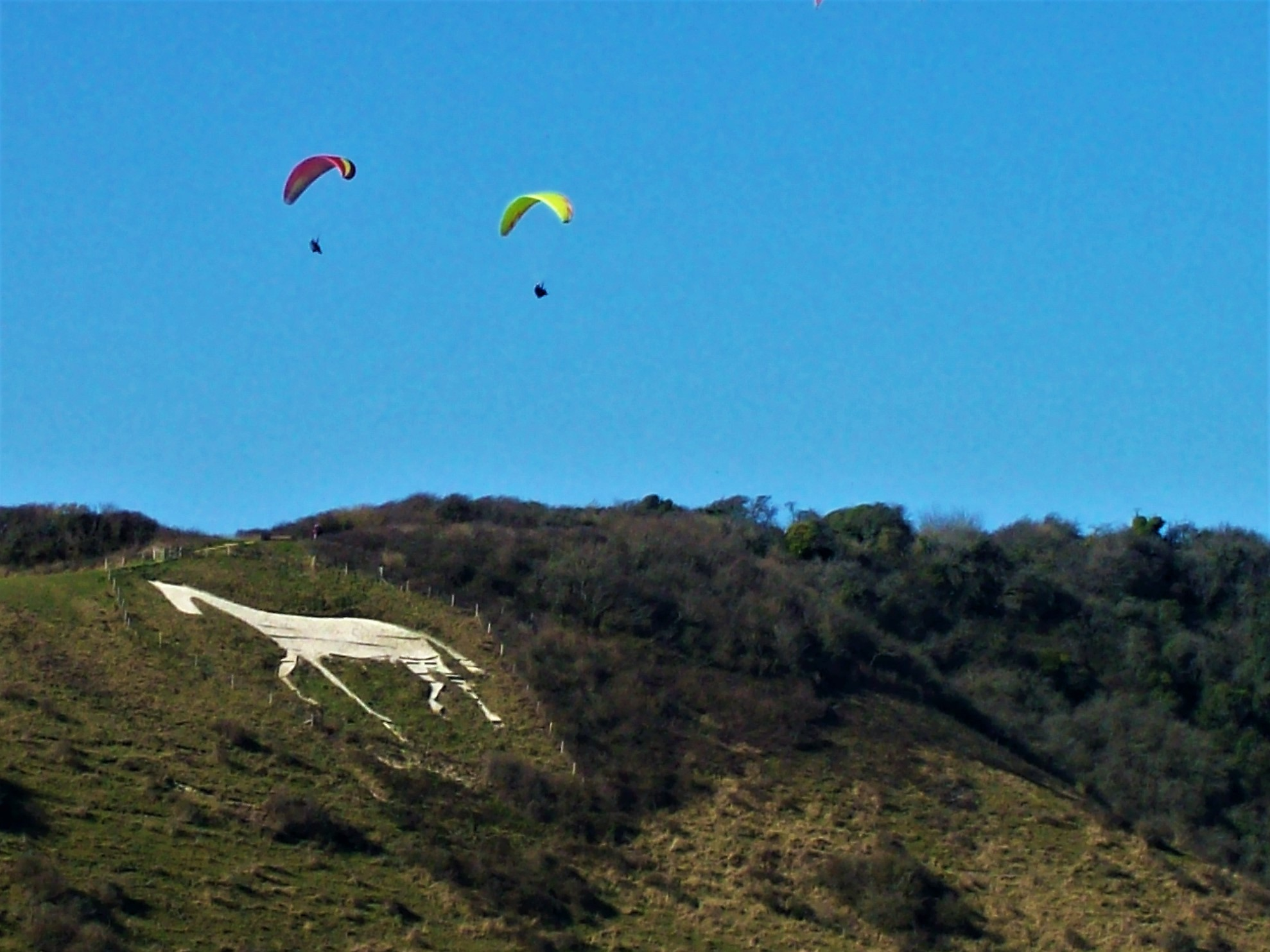
Paragliders over the second horse

Beyond its historical role, the Litlington White Horse has become a symbol of local identity and pride. It features in local art, literature, and even in the branding of local businesses and organisations. The horse has also been featured in numerous paintings, photographs, and films. Its striking image against the rolling hills of East Sussex makes it a popular subject for artists seeking to capture the beauty and history of the English countryside.

Today, the Litlington White Horse is a popular spot for hikers and tourists, offering views of the surrounding countryside and the Cuckmere Valley. It serves as a waypoint for many walking routes across the South Downs, attracting visitors interested in both natural beauty and historical landmarks. The horse also features in local educational programs, where schools and community groups visit the site to learn about local history, geology, and ecology.

=== In games and literature ===
The Litlington White Horse was the solution to Pimania, a 1982 text-and-graphics adventure game by Automata UK designers Mel Croucher and Christian Penfold; Guinness World Records credits it as the first video game treasure hunt. Released in 1982, the clues revealing the White Horse were not identified until 1985 by Sue Cooper and Lizi Newman, by which time its publisher Automata UK had ceased trading. The game’s various locations were designed to represent parts of a horse, with it finally identifying the winning site as the mouth of the Litlington White Horse. On 22 July 1985, the winners arrived at the horse, where the game’s creators presented them with the prize: a golden sundial valued at £6,000 (equivalent to £26,700 in 2023).

The Litlington White Horse served as the inspiration for Miriam Moss's book The Horse Girl (2002), which tells the story of a young girl who secretly carves a large white horse on the chalky hill overlooking her village after her mother forbids her from going near real horses.

=== In art and poetry ===
In 2025, artist Alfie Caine debuted an exhibition in New York titled The Chalk Carver’s House, inspired by the Litlington White Horse and its landscape context. The show featured seven paintings, each placing the chalk horse within dreamlike and surreal domestic interiors like framed windows, doorways, and surrounded by seemingly mundane objects (flowers, bananas on a table).

The Litlington White Horse has been featured in various poems and ballads, most notably in the poem The Sussex White Horse, which is attributed to an unknown author and predates 1880. The poem tells the story of an individual who becomes lost while wandering the Sussex Downs and struggles to find their way back. Ultimately, the person encounters the Sussex White Horse, which serves as a guiding landmark. The poem's closing lines are:

I looked to left, and looked to right,
When sudden glimmering on my sight
The Sussex White Horse rose;

I nearer drew, and followed till
I saw his head above the hill,
With mane, and eyes, and nose.

And now though twilight darkens round,
I feel that I the way have found,
For well I know the song:
If you will always hold your course,
And follow by the old White Horse,
You cannot far go wrong.

== Access ==
The figure is served by several major public rights of way. The South Downs Way, a 100-mile (160 km) National Trail, passes the summit of Hindover Hill, while the Vanguard Way, a long-distance route between London and Newhaven, traverses the hillside in close proximity to the horse.

Public access to the site is provided by a car park on Alfriston Road (B2108), with a steep footpath leading down to the horse. Due to the 45-degree gradient of the hillside and the site's status as a managed landmark, the National Trust maintains designated paths to minimise erosion. While the figure is accessible directly, the steepness of the terrain creates a degree of anamorphic distortion when viewed from the hillside; consequently, the horse's full proportions are most clearly visible from the valley floor, specifically along the banks of the River Cuckmere south of Litlington village.

== Gallery ==
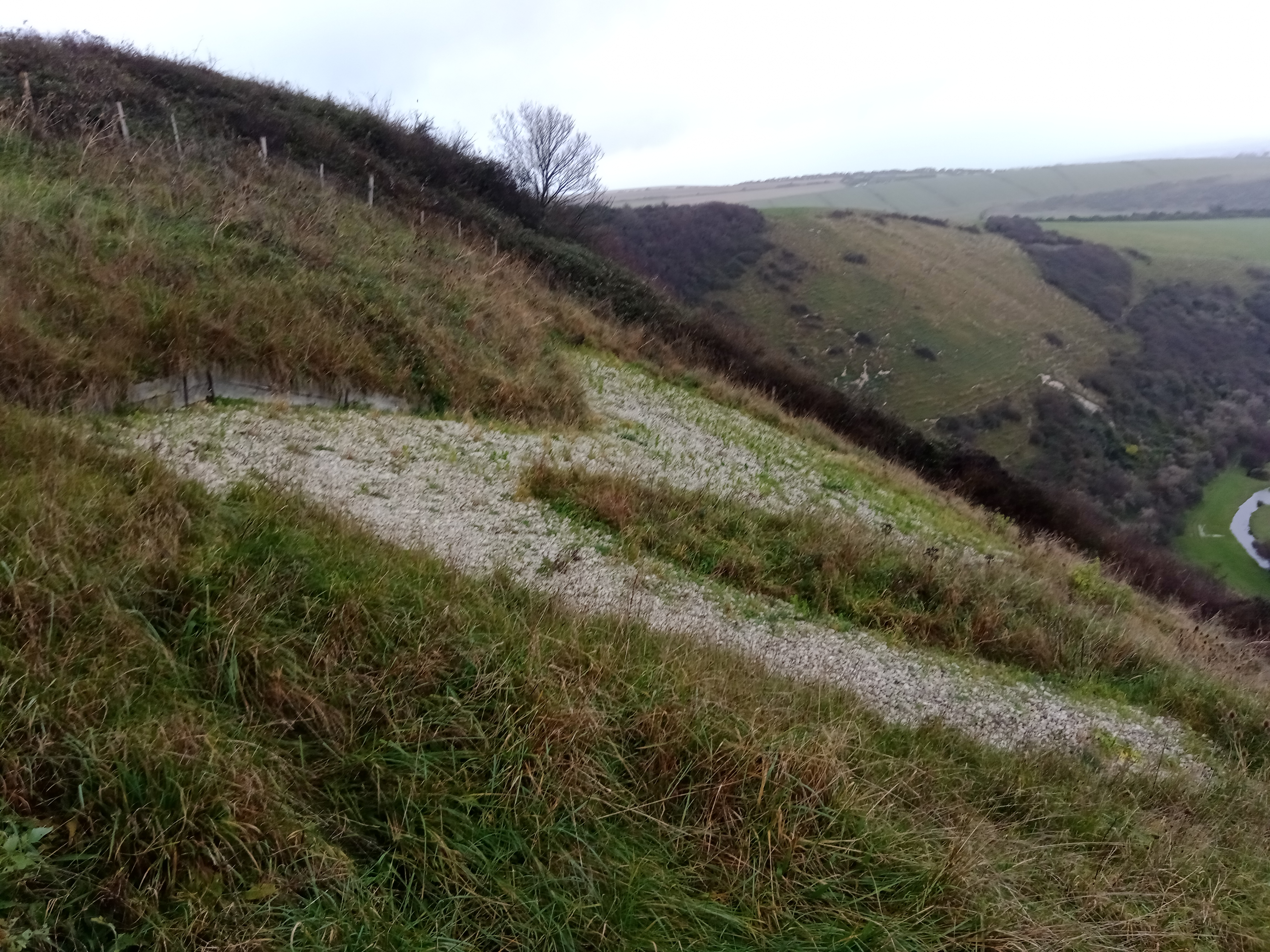
Second horse before being scoured

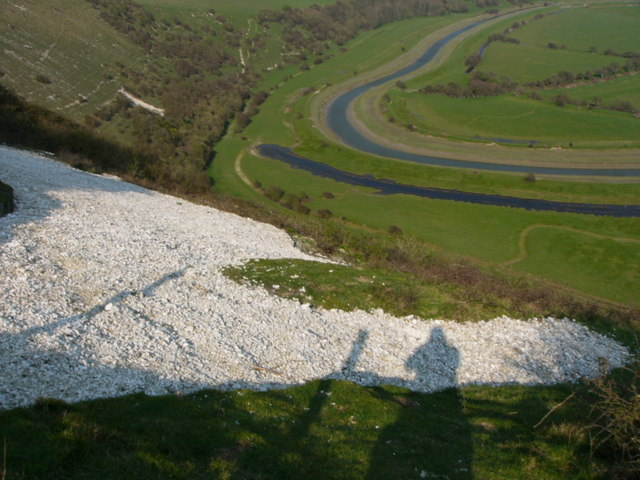
Second horse after being scoured

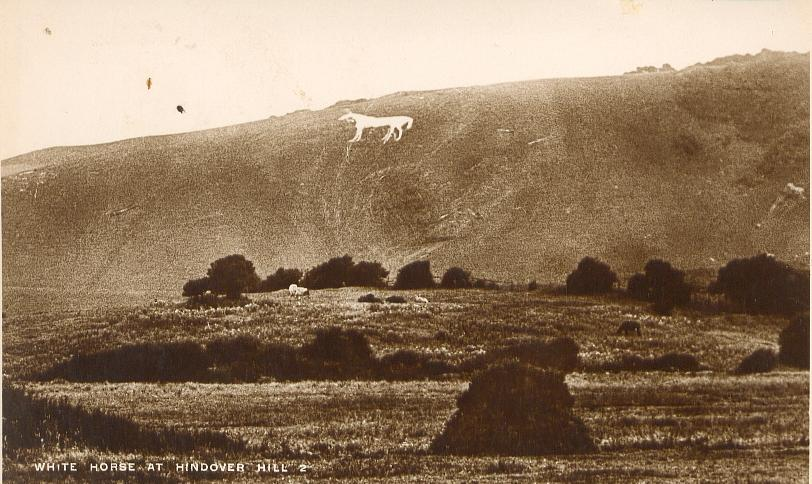
Second horse soon after being cut in the late 1920s

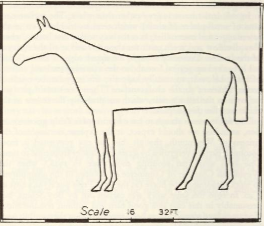
Drawing of the second Litlington White Horse in 1936

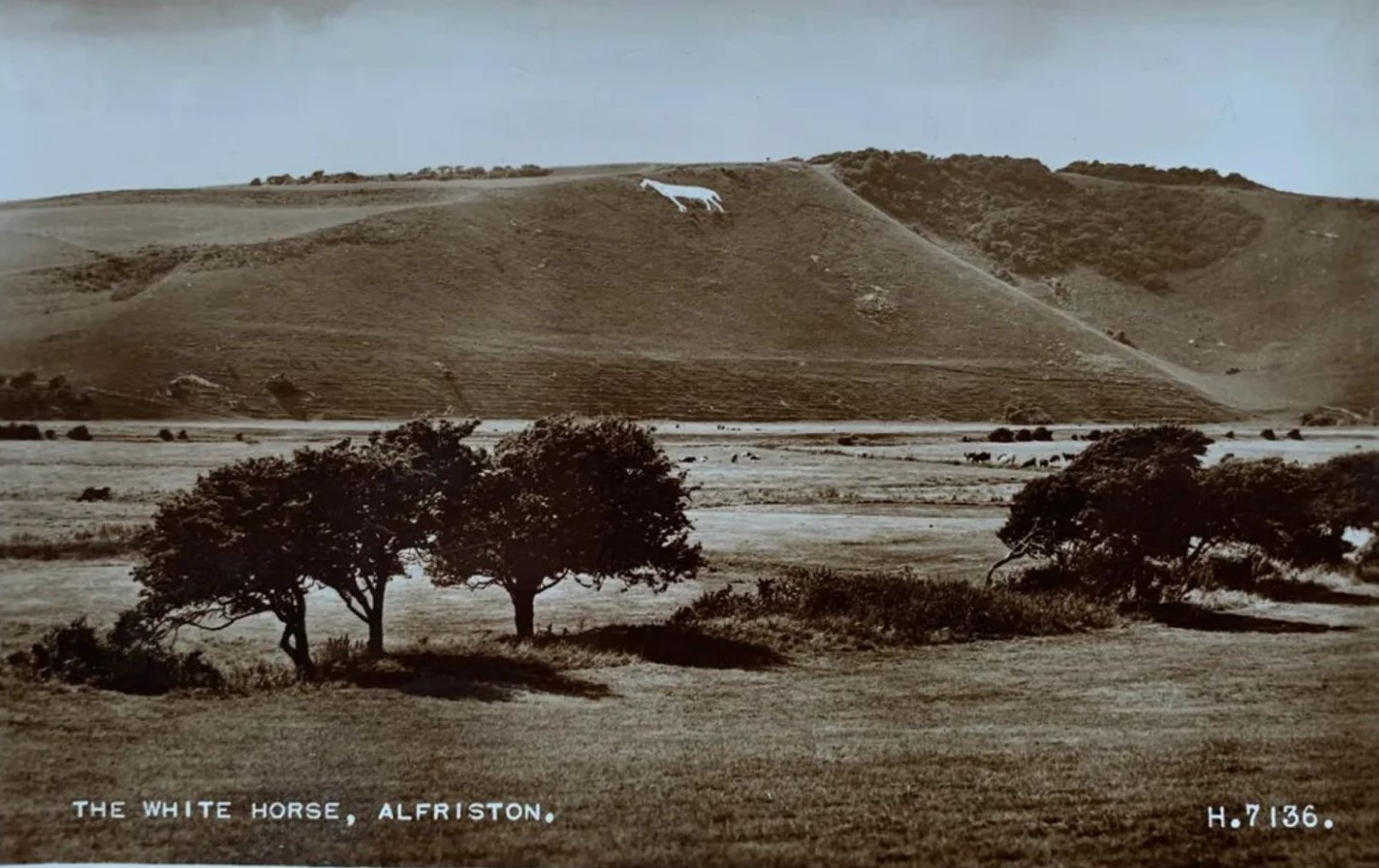
Second horse with only one front leg after being uncovered in 1945

== See also ==
=== Other white horses ===
- Alton Barnes white horse
- Broad Town White Horse
- Cherhill White Horse
- Devizes White Horse
- Hackpen White Horse
- Kilburn White Horse
- Marlborough White Horse
- Mormond Hill White Horse
- Osmington White Horse
- Pewsey White Horse
- Uffington White Horse
- Westbury White Horse
- Woolbury White Horse

=== Other hill figures ===
- Bulford Kiwi
- Cerne Abbas Giant
- Fovant Badges
- Lamb Down Military Badge
- Long Man of Wilmington
- Solsbury Hill turf maze
- The Mizmaze

== Sources and further reading ==
- Bergamar, Kate (1997). Discovering Hill Figures. Princes Risborough: Shire Publications. ISBN 978-0-7478-0345-4.
- Castleden, Rodney (1983). The Wilmington Giant: The Quest for a Lost Myth. London: Turnstone Press. ISBN 978-0-85500-181-0.
- Marsden, Fiona (1984). "The White Horse near Litlington, East Sussex" (PDF). Sussex Archaeological Collections. 122: 222–223.
- Marsden, Fiona (1986). "The White Horse near Litlington: A Further Note" (PDF). Sussex Archaeological Collections. 124: 251–252.
- Marples, Morris (1970) [1949]. White Horses and Other Hill Figures. Wakefield: S.R. Publishers. ISBN 978-0-85409-611-4.
- Pagden, Florence (1950). History of Alfriston (9th ed.). Hove: Combridges. OCLC 563502804.
- Simpson, Jacqueline (1973). The Folklore of Sussex. London: B.T. Batsford Ltd. ISBN 978-0-7134-0466-1.
