= Albert Hilton (cricketer) =

English cricketer

Albert Walter Hilton (9 July 1862 – 4 September 1935) was an English cricketer active from 1891 to 1895 who played for Sussex. He was born in Alfriston and died in Brighton. He appeared in 29 first-class matches and bowled left arm medium pace. He scored 182 runs with a highest score of 28 and took 89 wickets with a best performance of seven for 47.
