= Lillingstone =

Lillingstone may refer to:

== People ==
- Luke Lillingstone (1653–1713), British Army general

== Places ==
- Lillingstone Dayrell, village in Buckinghamshire, England
- Lillingstone Lovell, village in Buckinghamshire, England

== See also ==
- Lillingston, a surname
