= Hubert Pagden =

South African cricketer (1897–1981)

Personal information
- Born: 7 December 1897; Port Elizabeth, Cape Colony
- Died: 15 February 1981 (aged 83); Port Elizabeth, South Africa
- Source: Cricinfo, 26 March 2021

Hubert Pagden (7 December 1897 – 15 February 1981) was a South African cricketer. He played in sixteen first-class matches for Eastern Province between 1924/25 and 1930/31.

== See also ==
- List of Eastern Province representative cricketers
