= William of Littlington =

English Carmelite friar and writer (died c. 1310–1312)

William of Littlington or Ludlington (died c. 1310–1312) was an English Carmelite friar and theological writer. He became a Carmelite of Stamford, and took the degree of Doctor of Theology at Oxford. He opposed the division of England and Scotland into two Carmelite provinces which had been ordered at the Council of Narbonne in 1303, and was excommunicated. After four years' penance in Paris, he was made provincial of the Carmelite Order in the Holy Land and Cyprus in 1309.

== Life ==
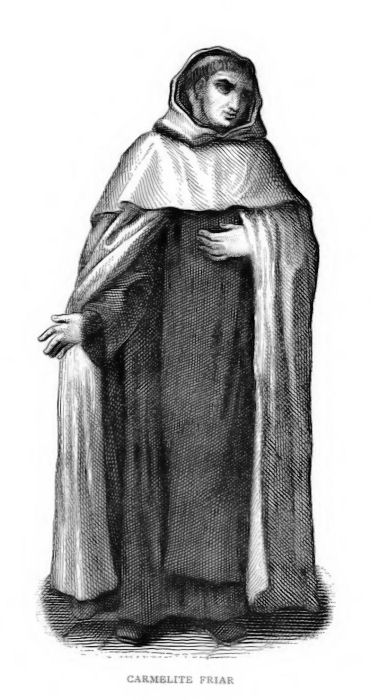
A Carmelite friar

William was, according to Leland, a native of Lindsey; according to Bale, of Littlington in Cambridgeshire. Richard Copsey, however, thinks his surname may have derived from Lyddington. He probably joined the Order of Carmelites in Stamford, which is close to Lyddington. He had taken the degree of Doctor of Theology at Oxford by 1301. On the death of Henry de Hanna, in 1300, he succeeded him as provincial of the order; and in 1303 when Gerard of Bologna arranged the separation of the Irish and Scottish Carmelite houses into a separate province from England at the Council of Narbonne in 1303, he opposed it. He was deposed and excommunicated, and subjected to a four years' penance to 'fast and study the holy scriptures', which time he spent in teaching at Paris. In 1309 he was made provincial of the Holy Land and Cyprus at the Council of Genoa. He died at the Stamford friary in about 1310 or 1312 and was buried there.

== Works ==
He wrote a Commentary on St. Matthew (St. Matthew's Gospel) which survives at New College, Oxford (MS. 47). Bale and Pits mention other commentaries and theological works by him which are not known to be extant.

== Sources ==
- Copsey, Richard (2004). "Ludlington, William [William of Littlington] (d. c. 1310x12), Carmelite friar". Oxford Dictionary of National Biography (online ed.). Oxford University Press. doi:10.1093/ref:odnb/29484. (Subscription or UK public library membership required.)

Attribution:

- This article incorporates text from a publication now in the public domain: Bateson, Mary (1900). "William of Littlington". In Lee, Sidney (ed.). Dictionary of National Biography. Vol. 61. London: Smith, Elder & Co. p. 377.
