= Lillington =

Lillington may refer to:

== Places ==
=== England ===
- Lillington, Dorset, a hamlet
- Lillington, Warwickshire, a suburb of Leamington Spa

=== United States ===
- Lillington, North Carolina, a town

== Other uses ==
- Karlin Lillington (born 1959), technology journalist
- The Lillingtons, a punk rock band

== See also ==
- Lillington Gardens, a housing estate in Pimlico, London
- Litlington (disambiguation)
