= Alfriston =

Village and parish in East Sussex, England

Coordinates: 50°48′29″N 0°09′18″E

- Village
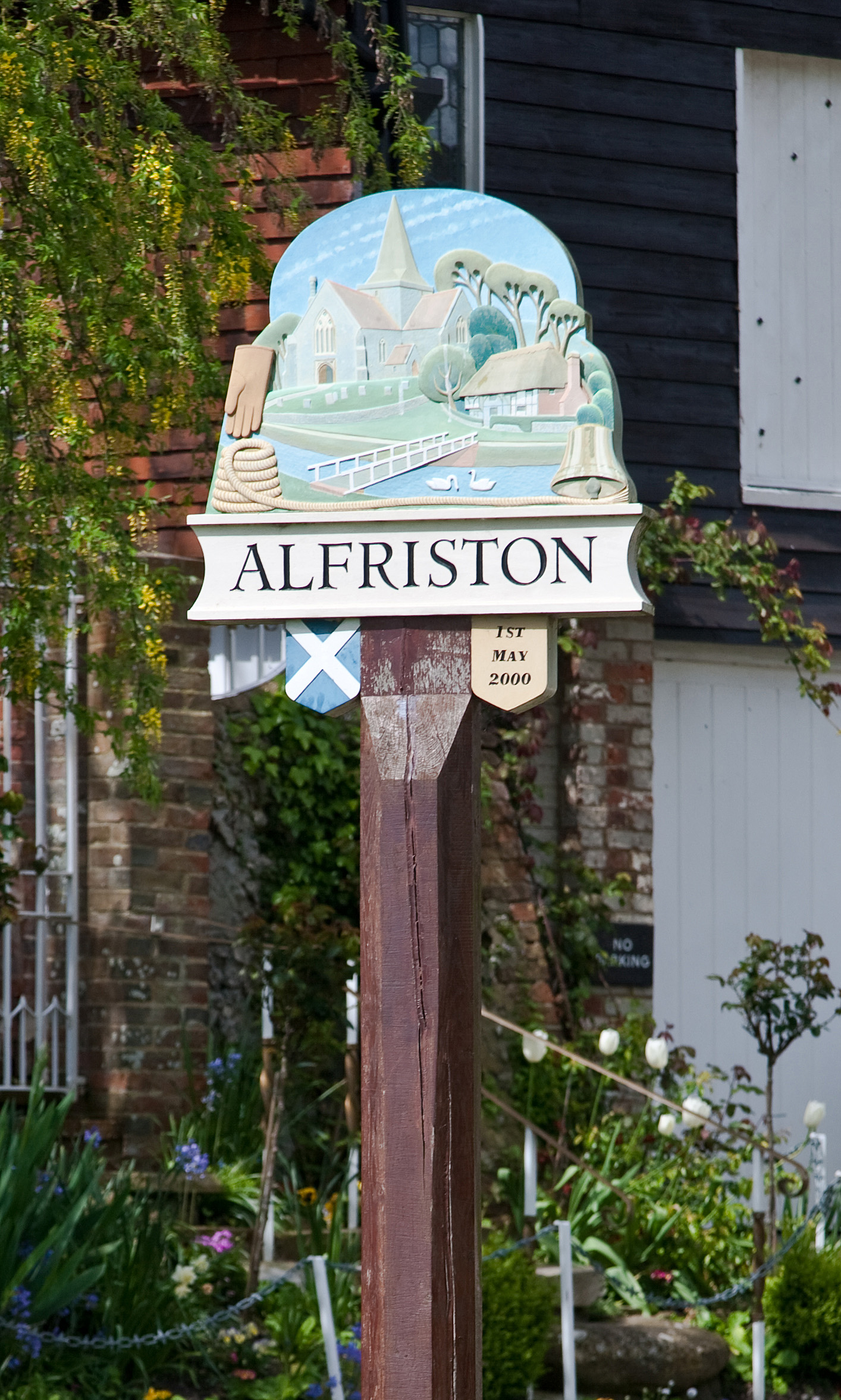
- Alfriston village sign

- Location within East Sussex
- Area: 9.36 km^{2} (3.61 sq mi)
- Population: 726 (2021 Census)
  - Density: 214.2/sq mi (82.7/km^{2})
- OS grid reference: TQ519030
  - London: 49 miles (79 km) NNW
- Civil parish: Alfriston
- District: Wealden
- Shire county: East Sussex
- Region: South East
- Country: England
- Sovereign state: United Kingdom
- Post town: POLEGATE
- Postcode district: BN26
- Dialling code: 01323
- Police: Sussex
- Fire: East Sussex
- Ambulance: South East Coast
- UK Parliament: Lewes
- Website: www.alfriston-village.co.uk

Alfriston is a village and civil parish in the Wealden District of East Sussex. The village lies in the valley of the River Cuckmere, about four miles (6 km) north-east of Seaford and south of the main A27 trunk road. The parish had a population of 762 at the 2021 census.

The village was commonly known as a market town during the medieval period.

== History ==
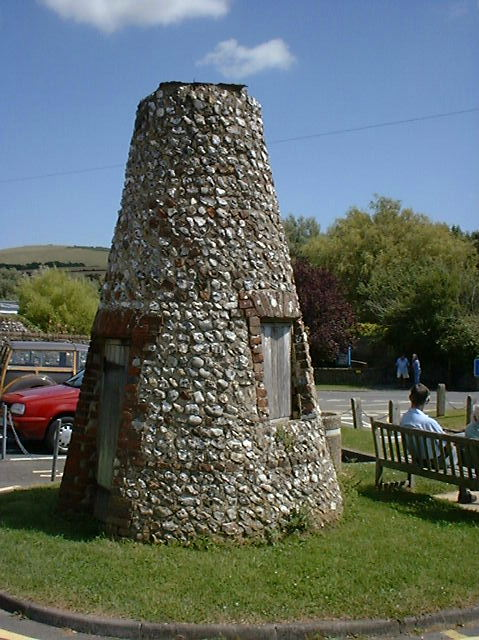
The Alfriston lock-up

There is strong evidence of ancient occupation of the area, since several Neolithic long barrows have been discovered on the surrounding Downs; among them, to the west is the fairly well preserved Long Burgh.

The place-name 'Alfriston' is first attested in the Domesday Book of 1086, where it appears as Alvricestone, comprising nine households. It appears as Alfrichestuna in a French document circa 1150. The name means 'Ælfric's town or settlement'.

One building of historical importance is the Star Inn. Originally a religious hostel built in 1345 and used to accommodate monks and pilgrims en route from Battle Abbey to the shrine of St Richard, patron saint of Sussex, at Chichester Cathedral, it became an inn in the 16th century. Wooden figures grace the upper part of the building, whilst in the front is a one-time ship's figurehead representing a red lion. The latter is connected with the Alfriston smuggling gang who used the inn as a base; their leader was transported to Australia in 1830. Another important historical building is Dean's Place Hotel which was built in the 17th century or earlier.

== Governance ==
An electoral ward in the same name exists. This ward stretches north to Chalvington with Ripe and has a total population taken at the 2011 census of 2,321.

At Westminster, Alfriston has been represented by James MacCleary, Liberal Democrat, Member of Parliament for Lewes since the 2024 general election when he defeated the Conservative incumbent Maria Caulfield.

== Churches ==
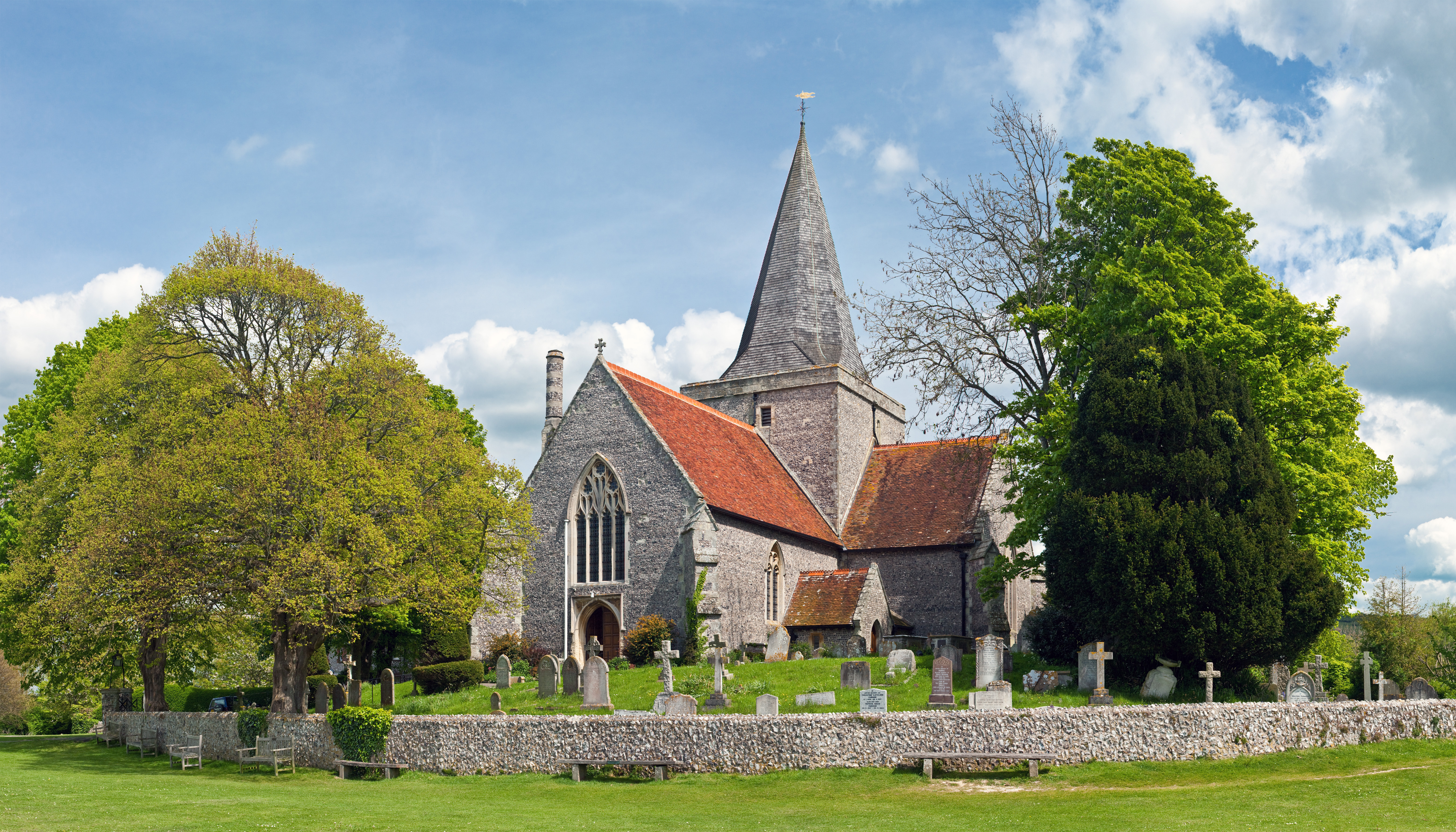
St Andrew's Church

The Alfriston parish church, dedicated to St Andrew, has Saxon origins, although most of the building dates from the 14th century. It is known, because of its size, as the Cathedral of the South Downs. It sits on a small, flint-walled mound in the middle of "the Tye" (the local village green), overlooking the River Cuckmere, and is surrounded by the flowered graveyard in which the Nobel laureate Sir Peter Medawar and the Labour politician Denis Healey are buried. It is built in the form of a cross. Today it is part of the united benefice which includes St Michael's Church at Litlington and All Saints Church at West Dean. Alfriston's former United Reformed Church is included in that grouping.

== The village of Alfriston ==
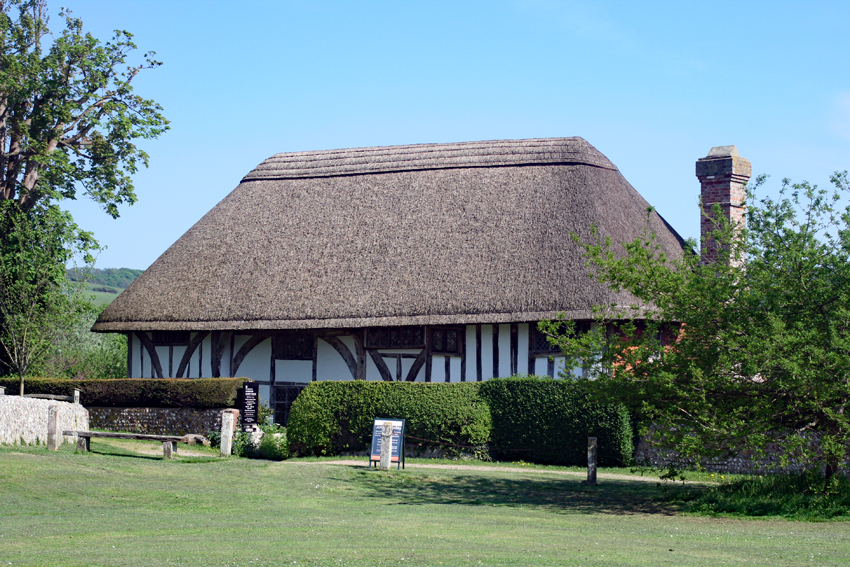
Alfriston clergy house

The east side of the village lies by the River Cuckmere and is home to the village green, which is called the Tye. In the centre of the Tye is St. Andrew's Church. The 14th-century Alfriston Clergy House close by was originally a farmhouse but later became the vicarage. It is now maintained by the National Trust. It was the very first property bought by the Trust, in 1896, and it is a classic example of a Wealden hall house with thatched roof and timber-framed walls. It also has a tranquil garden and orchard on the banks of the Cuckmere. Also on the Tye is the Georgian Unitarian Chapel. The wooden sign for the village at the entrance to the Tye was carved by a previous vicar of the village who also repaired the Star Inn's red lion. The centre of the village is Market Square which contains a 15th-century market cross.

The village contains four pubs, the Star Inn, the Smugglers' Inn, the George Inn and the Six Bells. A Channel 5 archaeology programme, Pub Dig, revealed evidence of long occupation of the site of the Smugglers' Inn, including signs of smuggling, animal butchery and neolithic activity at the rear of the building. In 2021, the Star Inn featured in another Channel 5 programme, called Alex Polizzi: My Hotel Nightmare, which documented the renovation of the 15th century, 37-bedroom coaching inn.

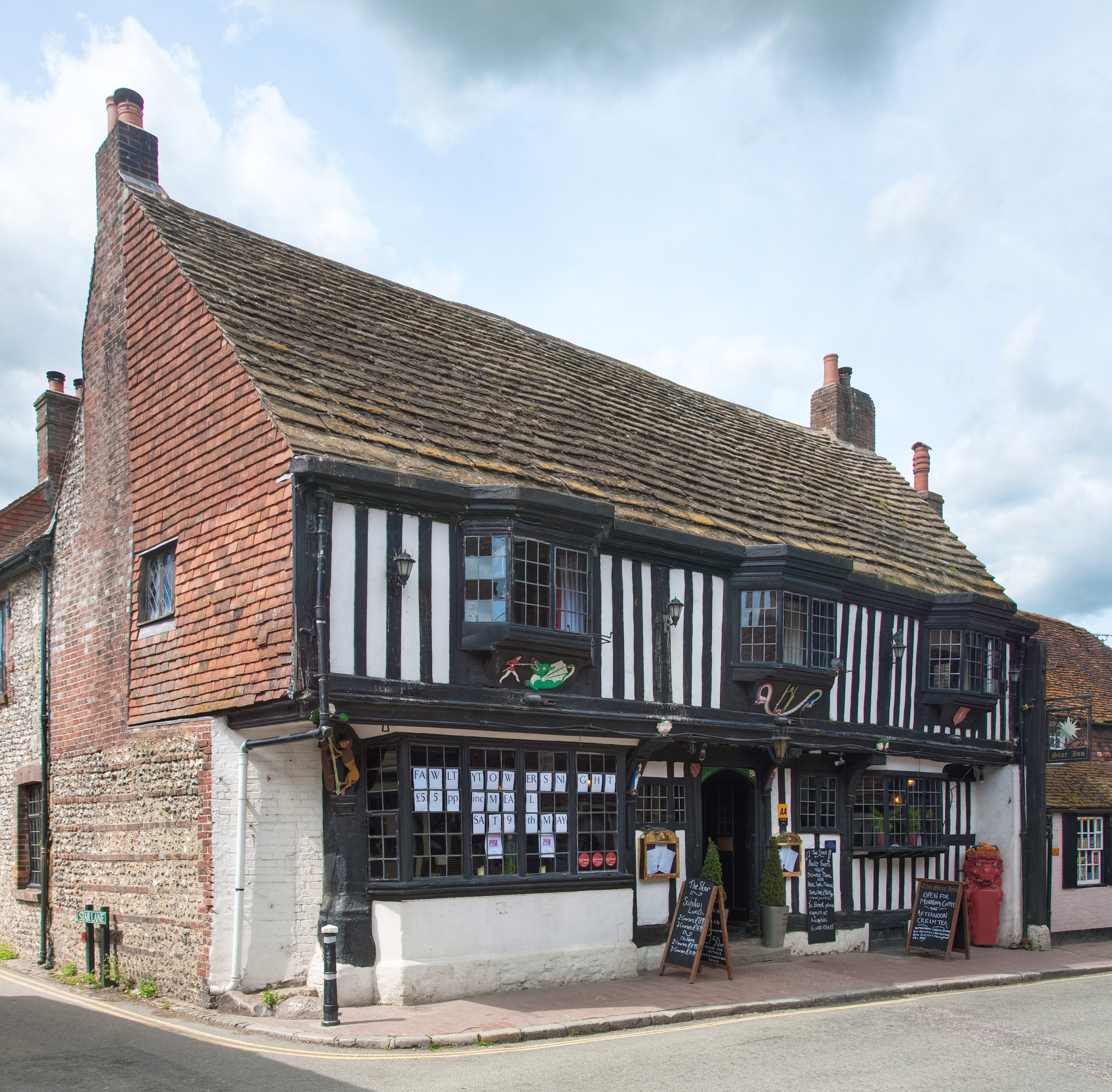
Star Inn

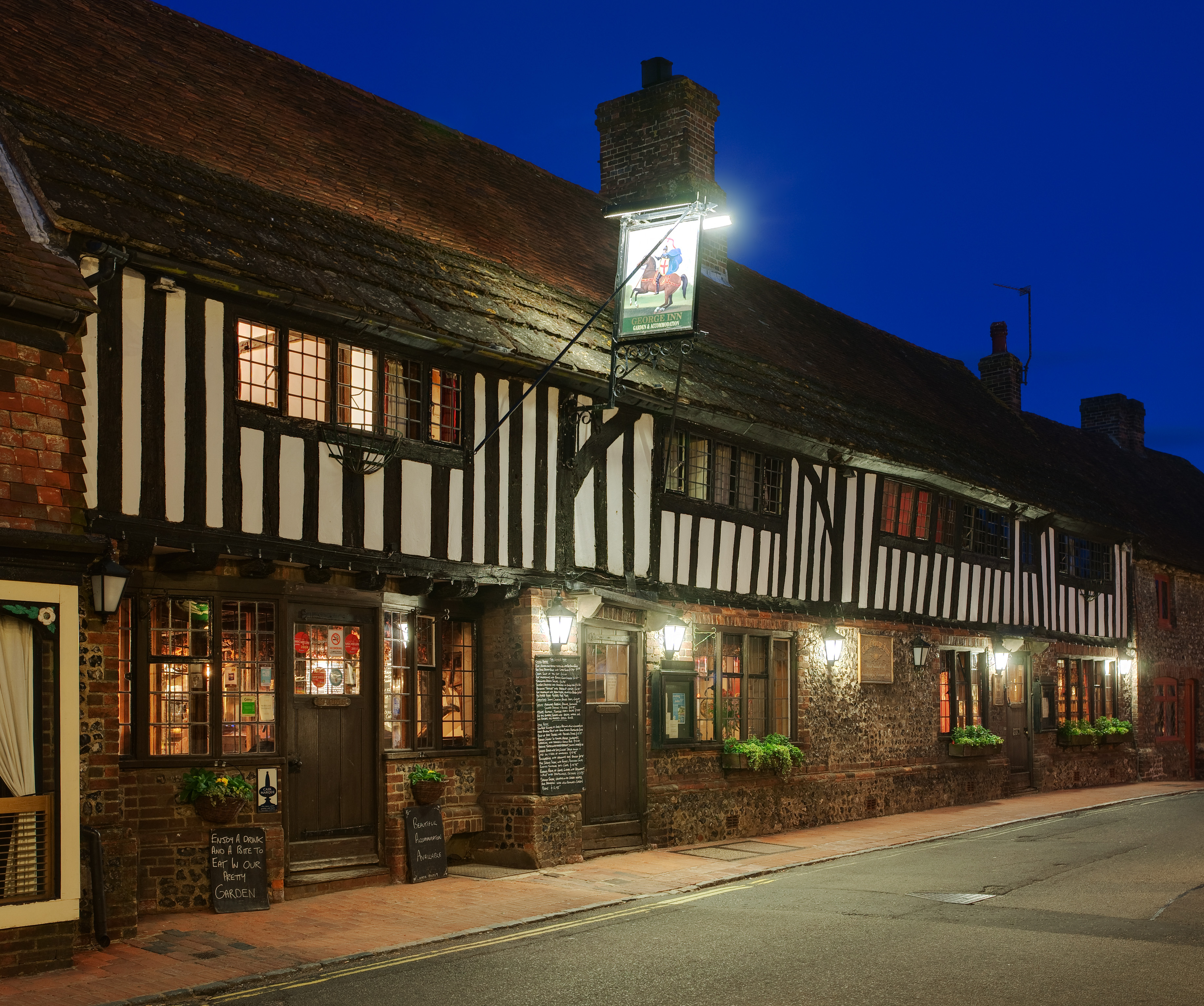
George Inn

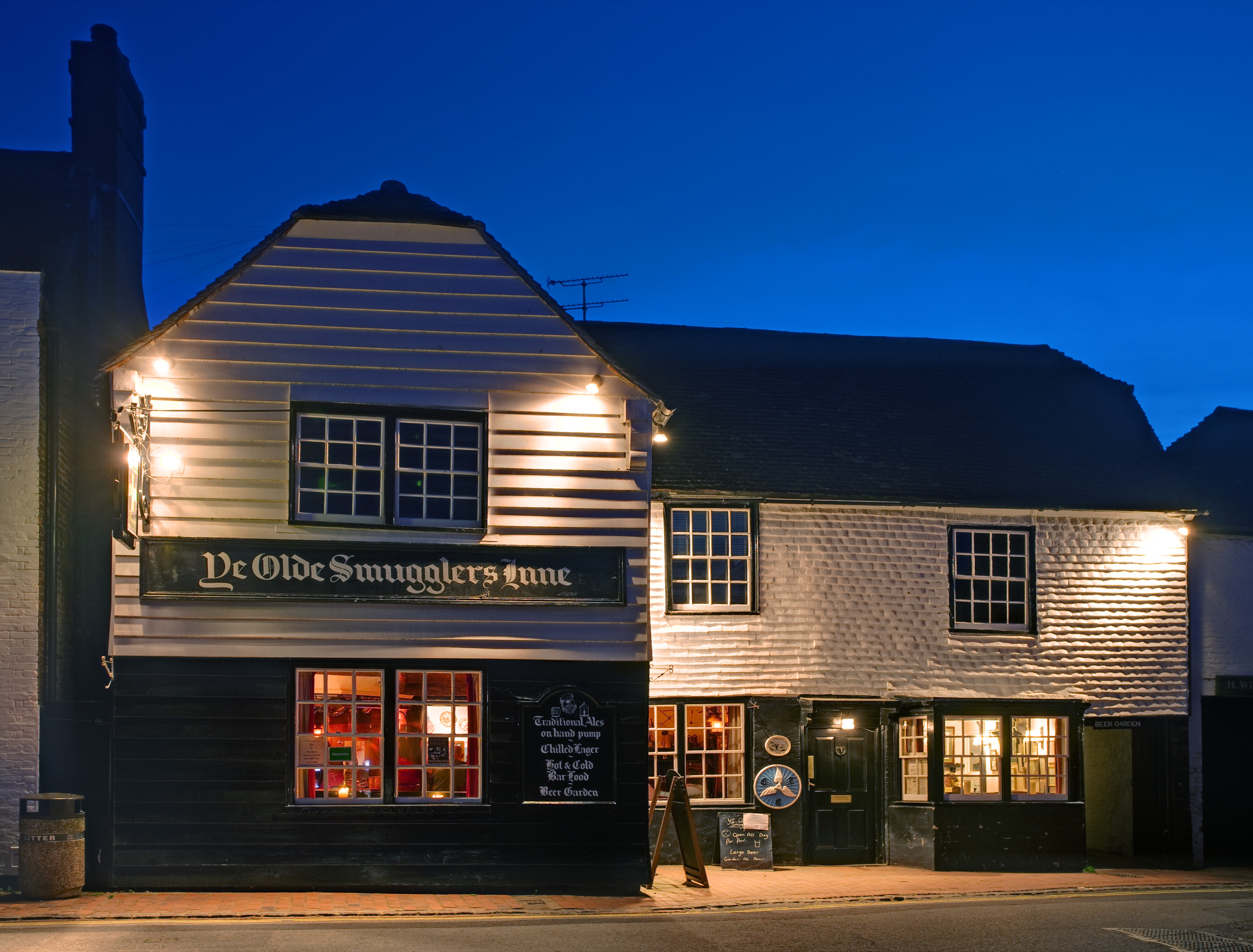
Smugglers Inn

The South Downs Way crosses the river in Alfriston, and then continues up onto the Downs.

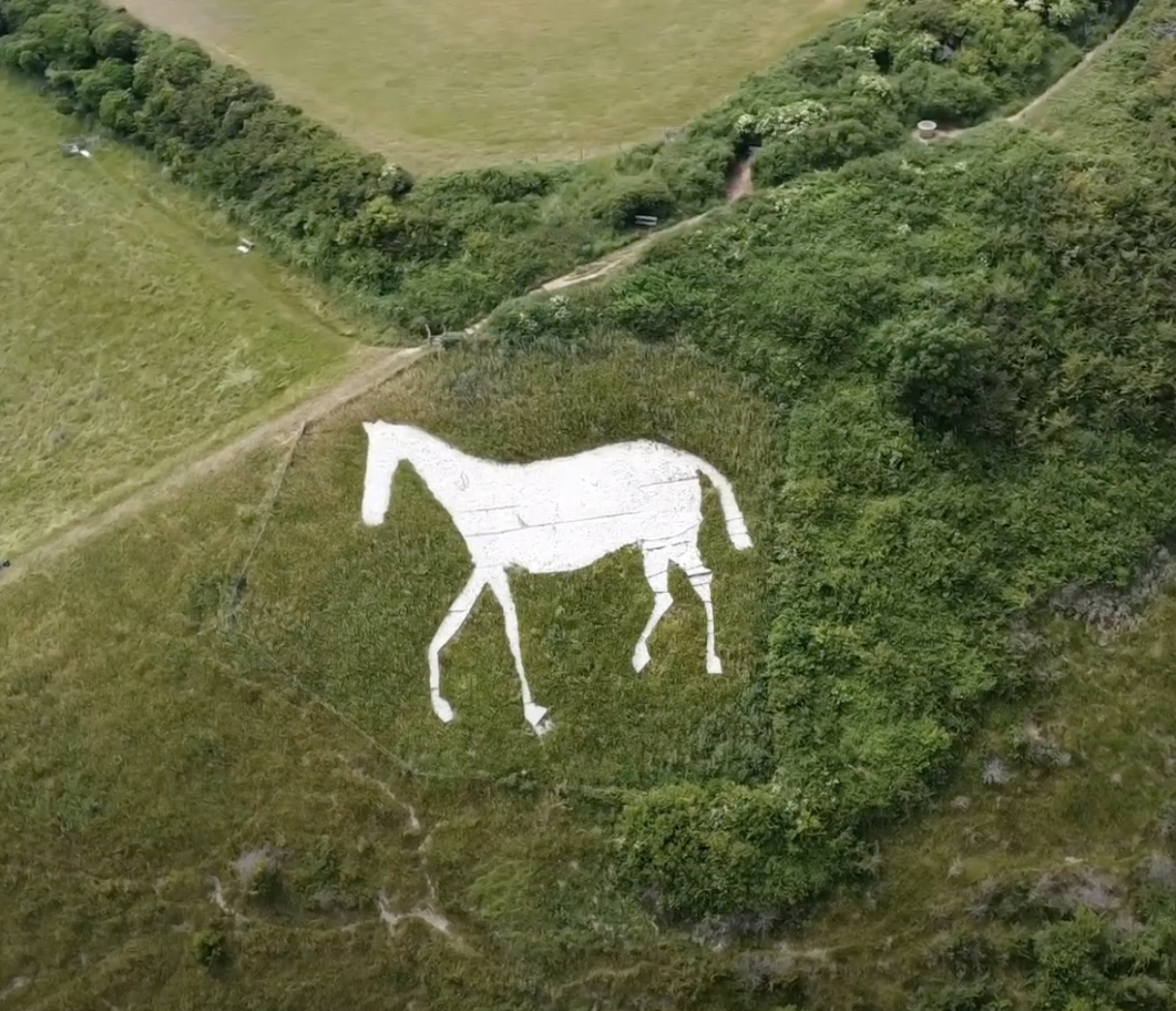
The Litlington White Horse, located within Alfriston parish

During the week leading up to the August bank holiday weekend, there is the Alfriston Festival, which ends with a Grand Fair on the Tye, with the proceeds going to several local national charities. It is attended by a large number of people from many miles around. In December there is also an Alfriston Christmas Weekend. The village also has its own clay pigeon shooting club. The Alfriston Cricket Club has won the Cuckmere Valley League on nine occasions, with the earliest being 1920 and the most recent 2003.

Overlooking the village from the east is the Litlington White Horse, a chalk hill figure cut into the downs. Despite its name, the figure is located within Alfriston parish on the Frog Firle Farm estate, an area of downland managed by the National Trust that provides a backdrop to the Cuckmere Valley. The figure is a popular landmark for walkers on the South Downs Way as they approach the village from the south.

== The arts and Alfriston ==
In 1931 Eleanor Farjeon wrote the popular hymn "Morning Has Broken" in Alfriston; the hymn is supposedly about the beauty she saw around her in this village. The song was later recorded by Cat Stevens in the 1970s, reaching a wider audience.

The 1946 novel Uneasy Terms by crime and thriller writer Peter Cheyney is set mainly in and around Alfriston. The private detective Slim Callaghan stays in one of the pubs in Alfriston, which in the novel is called 'The Two Friars', whilst solving a murder at the nearby house 'Dark Spinney', home of the Alardyse family. The author describes the village thus: "Callaghan walked slowly through the open space at the end of Alfriston High Street. The afternoon sun shone on the old houses, and the tree in the middle of the little square threw a pleasant shadow." Several other local places are mentioned in the novel, among them Brighton, Eastbourne, Herstmonceux, Pevensey Bay, Rottingdean and Polegate. The book was made into a film in 1948, starring Moira Lister and Michael Rennie. Cheyney also mentions Alfriston in several other of his novels, including Dance without Music (1947).

Another well-known thriller-writer, Victor Canning, sets the prologue to his 1956 novel The Hidden Face (US Burden of Proof) in Alfriston. The hero Peter Barlow comes to the village to confront a resident, James Gurney Hansford, who has cheated his father and driven him to suicide. They fight. Later Hansford is murdered and Barlow wrongly convicted of the crime.

The 1964 film The Chalk Garden starring Sir John Mills, Hayley Mills and Deborah Kerr was filmed in and around the village.

Peter Sellers' 1962 film Waltz of the Toreadors was also filmed here.

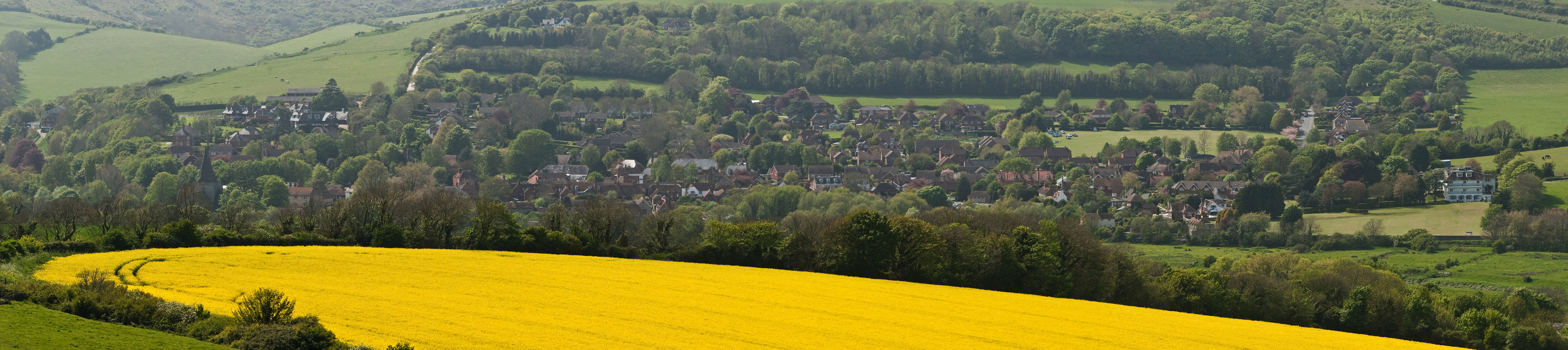
A panoramic view of the village of Alfriston from the South Downs Way bridleway

== Notable people ==
- Dr June Goodfield (1927–2025) historian, scientist and writer
- Denis Healey, Baron Healey, CH, MBE, PC, FRSL (1917–2015 in Alfriston) a British Labour Party politician, Secretary of State for Defence 1964–1970, Chancellor of the Exchequer 1974–1979 and Deputy Leader of the Labour Party 1980–1983
- Edna Healey (1918 – 2010) author, lecturer and filmmaker. Wife of Denis.
- Albert Hilton (1862 in Alfriston – 1935) an English cricketer active from 1891 to 1895 who played for Sussex, appearing in 29 first-class matches
- Peter Medawar (1915–1987) and his wife are buried in Alfriston
- James Pagden (1820–1880), first-class cricketer for Sussex, a prominent 19th-century beekeeper who invented the "Pagden method" of swarm control and cutter of the First Litlington White Horse.
- Elgar Pagden (1820–1880), first-class cricketer
- Jacqueline Wilson (1945– ) children's author of the Tracy Beaker franchise, lives in Alfriston
- Guy Pratt, former Pink Floyd bassist lives near Alfriston, and rings bells at St Andrew's Church
