= Cuckmere River =

River in East Sussex, England

Coordinates: 50°45′34.1″N 0°8′54″E

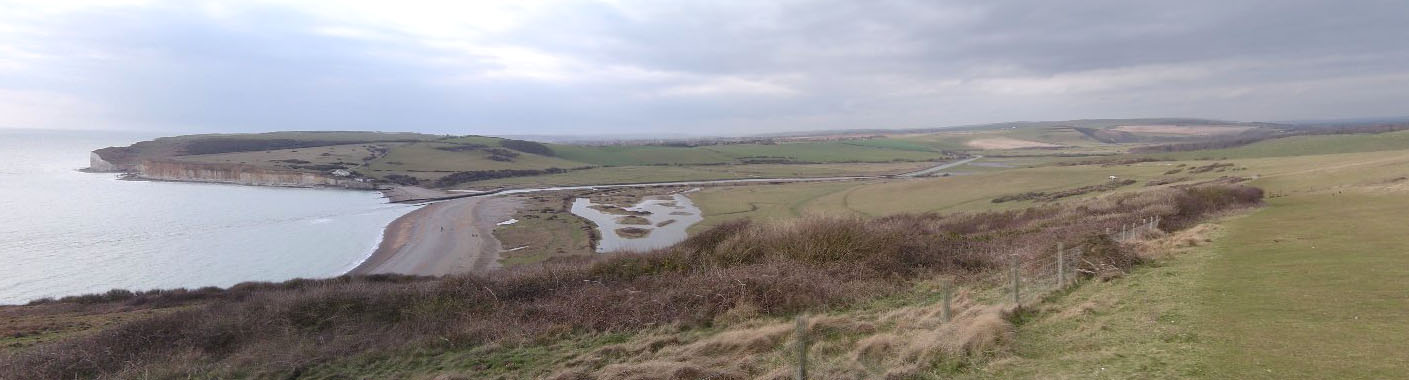
- Looking West over Cuckmere Haven

Location
- Country: England (East Sussex)

Physical characteristics
- Source
  - location: Near Heathfield
- Mouth
  - location: English Channel
- Length: 32 km (20 mi)

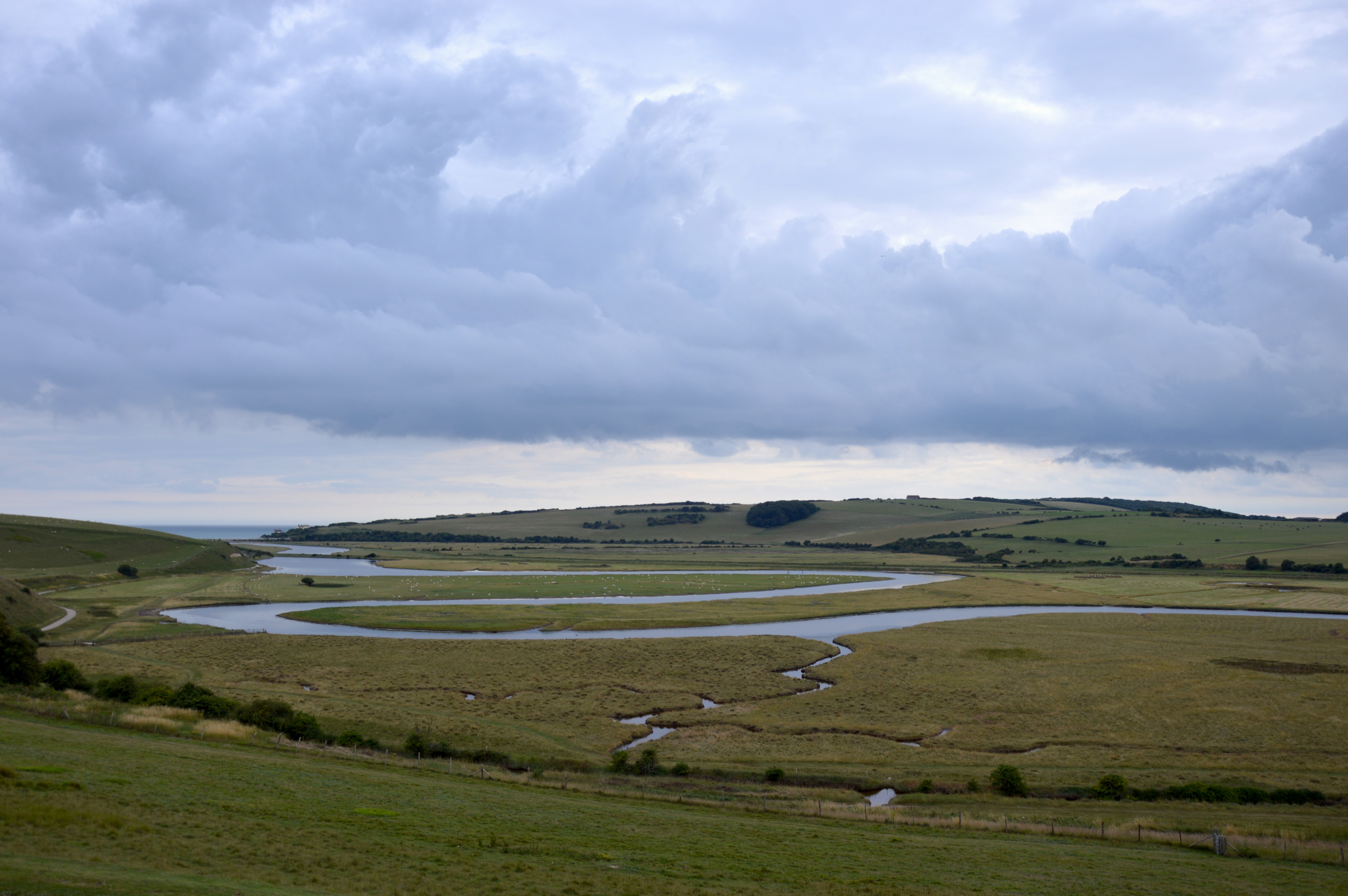
Meander of the River Cuckmere

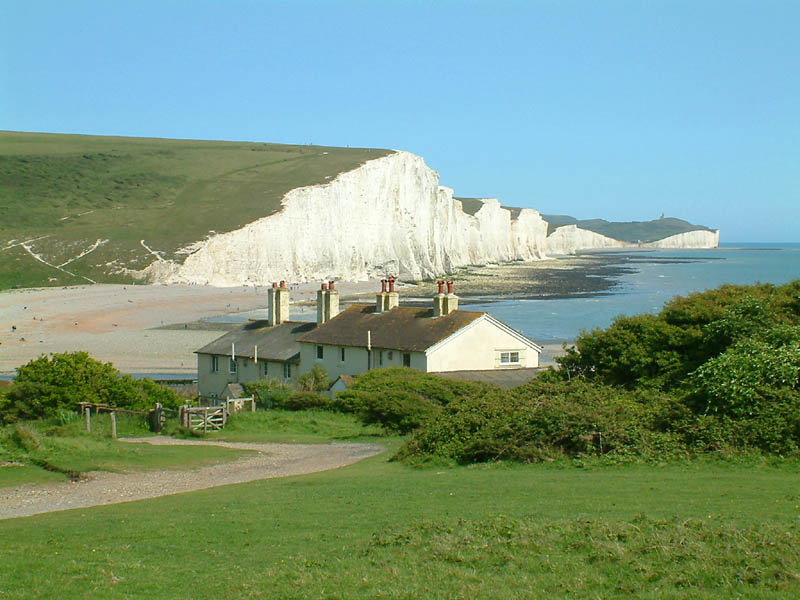
The Seven Sisters cliffs and the coastguard cottages, from Seaford Head showing Cuckmere Haven (looking East)

The Cuckmere River rises near Heathfield, East Sussex, England on the southern slopes of the Weald. The name of the river probably comes from an Old English word meaning "fast-flowing", since it descends over 100 m (330 ft) in its initial 6.4 kilometres (4.0 miles). It flows into the English Channel, and has the only undeveloped river mouth on the Sussex coast.

== Description ==
The river has many tributaries at its upper end, the principal one being the River Bull; and its main channel begins at Hellingly. After crossing the Low Weald area of farmland, the Cuckmere cuts through the South Downs in its own valley. It reaches the English Channel at Cuckmere Haven, between Seaford and the Seven Sisters cliff face. The lower part of its course in the floodplain is marked by meandering. The Cuckmere Valley Nature Reserve is located in the lower estuary portion of the river. The valley is very important for nature conservation. It has been designated a Site of Special Scientific Interest and is part of the South Downs National Park.

== History and environmental issues ==
The Cuckmere Valley civil parish takes its name from the river. In the 19th century, defensive measures were taken to prevent flooding of the upper valley. Shingle was regularly dug from the mouth of the river and the banks were made higher. In 1846, the course of the river was straightened in an artificial cut; the cut mostly prevented flooding upstream, which used to reach to the village of Alfriston. It also provided support for irrigation. In addition, raised river banks, or levees, were constructed to protect areas from flooding.

In recent decades, the area has become a major tourist destination, with tourism contributing to the local economy more than does agriculture. The river also stands at the foot of the current Litlington White Horse carved in 1924.

In 2001, the Cuckmere Estuary Partnership was established as a collaboration of the National Trust, Natural England, Environment Agency, East Sussex County Council, Sussex Wildlife Trust, and various other environmental and conservation groups. They are working together to create long-term plans for the natural area. Government guidelines prohibit continuing to maintain hard flood defences where houses are not at risk. In addition, there is growing scientific evidence that the area would be more ecologically rich if allowed to return to its natural state. The partnership and the Environment Agency have proposed estuary restoration, and have been talking to residents, businesses, and visitors about how to proceed in the future. Presently, a shingle beach and raised river banks prevent seawater from penetrating the uppermost areas of the Cuckmere Valley. But the Environment Agency projects that an expected sea level rise due to climate change will increase the already steep costs of physical reinforcement, and current measures will not be sufficient. They intend to stop repair of the levees and to allow the cycle of natural processes, including periodic flooding of the area. The planning collaborators believe that in the long term, restoration of the saltwater estuary and marshes will enrich the ecological habitat, attract more wildlife and improve tourism.

The Environment Agency plans have provoked controversy in the valley, especially among some property owners. Some residents have formed a group called "Rescue the Cuckmere Valley" to try to create an alternative to proposed seasonal flooding. In early 2008 the Cuckmere Parish Council issued a public statement urging the Environment Agency to take less drastic steps in the near term, protecting the Cut while developing longer-term plans over the next 25–50 years.

== In popular culture ==
Cuckmere features in Wicked (2024) as the entrance to Shiz University when Galinda arrives.
