= Pewsey White Horse =

Hill figure of a white horse in England

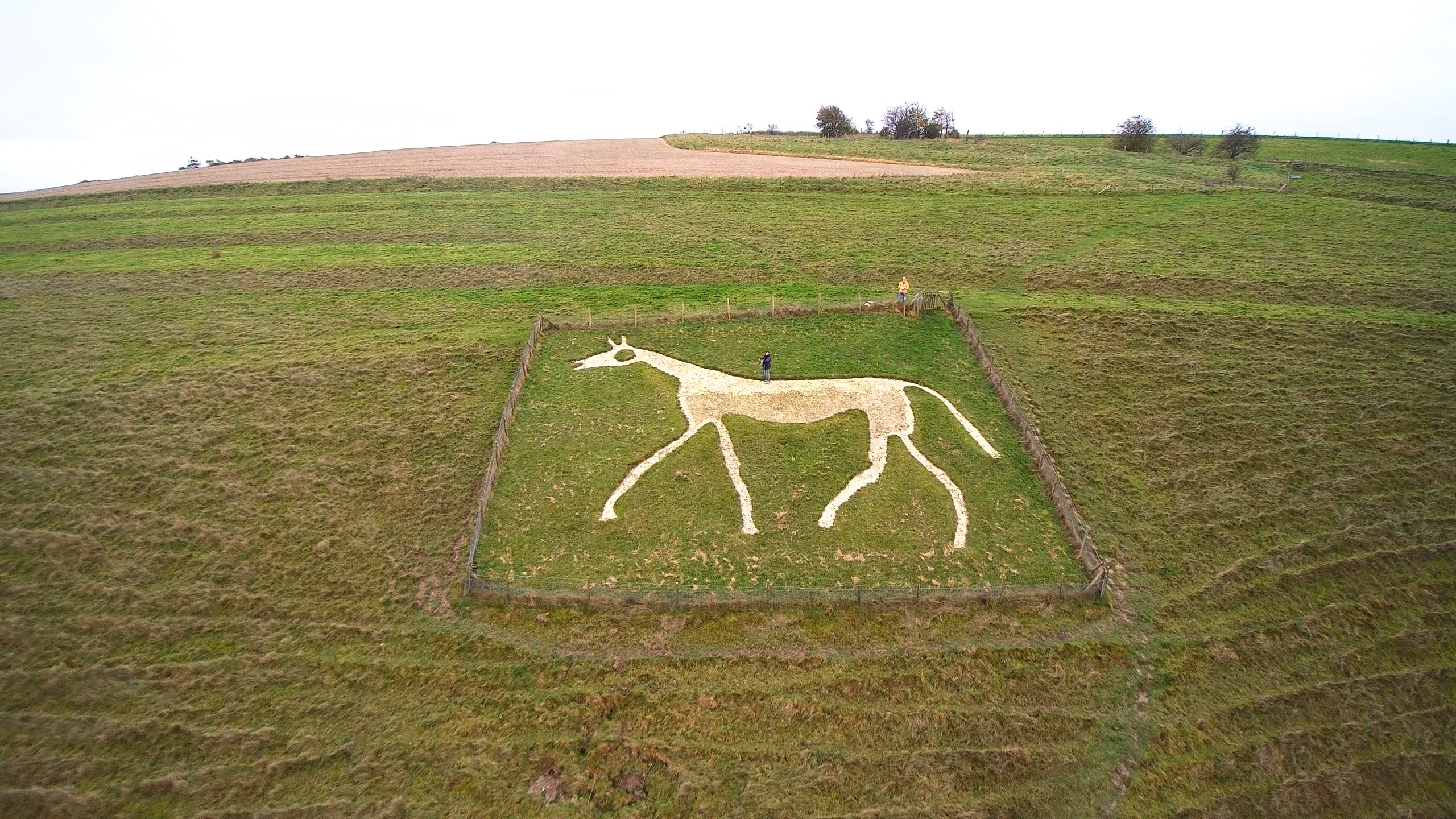
- Pewsey White Horse in 2017

- Location in Wiltshire
- 51°19′16″N 1°45′24″W
- Type: Hill figure
- Location: Pewsey, Wiltshire, England

History
- Built: 1937

Site notes
- Material: Chalk
- Height: 14 metres (46 ft)
- Length: 20 metres (66 ft)
- Public access: Yes

Pewsey White Horse is a hill figure of a white horse near the village of Pewsey, Wiltshire, England. Cut of chalk in 1937, it replaces an earlier horse that had disappeared under the grass and is one of eight remaining white horses in Wiltshire. It measures 66’ by 45’, making it the smallest of the eight canonical white horses in Wiltshire.

When Pewsey White Horse was cut it was the seventh or eighth White Horse in Wiltshire (the confusion arising as Rockley White Horse was unknown until 1948) and the first of the 20th century. It was also one of the smallest. George Marples, the father of Morris Marples, who later wrote about the white horse, designed it to commemorate the coronation of George VI, inspired by other white horses in Wiltshire.

The horse is a prominent landmark in Pewsey, and today it is maintained and scoured by the Pewsey 6X Club, who work under the name Pewsey Horse Restoration Group. Wiltshirewhitehorses.org.uk consider it to be a "well-proportioned representation of the real animal." The white horse also features on the town flag of Pewsey, whose registration notes describe the horse as "iconic". Barry Leighton of the Swindon Advertiser describes the horse as standing in a "care-free trotting stance." The Gazette and Herald have referred to the horse as "one of Pewsey's proudest monuments."

== Origins ==
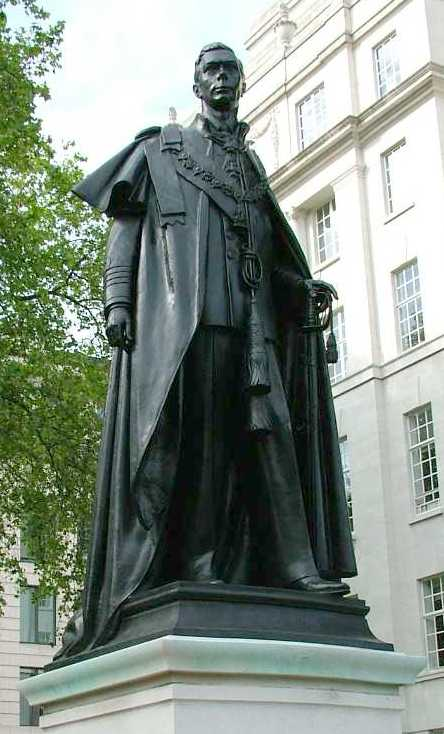
The horse was cut to commemorate the coronation of George VI.

A previous white horse was cut on the same hill, probably in 1785. It was cut by, or on the instructions of, Robert Pile of Manor Farm, Alton Barnes. The nearby Alton Barnes White Horse was cut 27 years later by a Robert Pile of the same address, but it is unknown if this is the same man. The horse received a scouring in 1789, believed to be the first and last scouring, as the landowner objected to the festivities which had accompanied the scouring and thus refused to allow it to happen again. Thus, it fell into neglect, and by the mid-1800s was in a bad state of repair. By the mid-1930s, the chalk of the horse was no longer visible. Nonetheless, the outline of the head and body could still vaguely be seen, both as raised contours revealed by both the light of the rising sun and as a discolouration of the grass.

As is visible from a sketch of the contours still visible in 1939, the horse may have been of fairly good proportions. A local legend says that the horse had a boy rider, but there appears to have been no visible rider in the late 1800s when the chalk was still able to be seen. Had it had a rider, it would have been one of two of such horses to do so in England, alongside the 19th century Osmington White Horse near Weymouth, Dorset.

In 1937, George Marples, an authority on hill figures, was in the area researching the horse, which at this time was barely visible, when he was approached by a committee that had just been formed to find a suitable way of commemorating the coronation of George VI. Marples drew up three designs for a horse and, for ease of maintenance, the horse shown trotting to the left was chosen. (The former Pewsey horse also faced the left, as did all other Wiltshire white horses at the time). Each of his designs showed '1937' above the horse to record the year, as the cutting years of several other horses in Wiltshire were, and still are, unknown. Marples suggested a triangular method for marking out the horse, and a sketch of this method is known to still exist.

In April 1937 it was cut by volunteers from Pewsey Fire Brigade. The year '1937' was cut above the horse, although it appears this part was never later scoured and thus is no longer visible. The horse was floodlit in coronation week and the effect was described as "very good" except for thick fog on two nights. The nearby Cherhill White Horse was also floodlit to mark the occasion. Notably, the Pewsey horse was cut 99 years after Hackpen White Horse was cut to commemorate the coronation of Queen Victoria, the only other horse in Wiltshire known to commemorate a coronation.

== Description and location ==
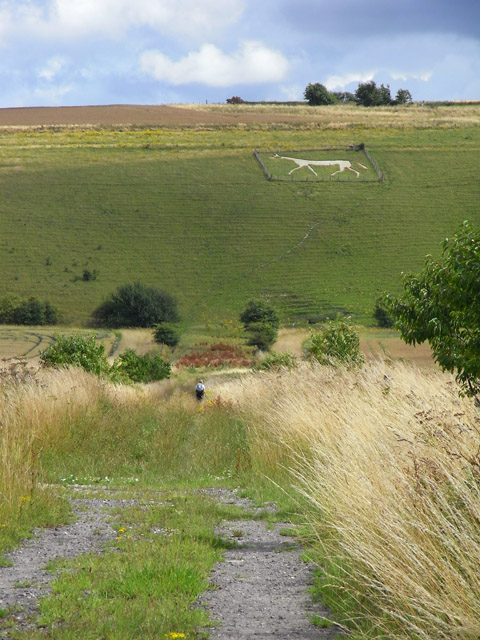
Pewsey White Horse from a distance

The smallest white horse in Wiltshire, Pewsey White Horse is 35 feet tall and 67 feet long. Pewsey White Horse is cut on private land roughly a mile south of Pewsey Village, on a steep NNW facing slope of Pewsey Hill about 500’ above sea level. Access to the horse is available to visitors. The horse can be seen from along the A345 near Pewsey Village and along the south of the village itself, but the horse is viewed most clearly from the Pewsey to Everleigh road below Pewsey Hill. The figure can be visited from the top of Pewsey Hill where there are footpaths leading to the horse and places where a car may be parked (although not designated parking places).

Pewsey Hill is a down (downland, a chalk hill) marking one end of the 19 mile Vale of Pewsey, where others of the white horses are located. Although not itself part of the downs, the vale is part of the North Wessex Downs AONB (Area of Outstanding Natural Beauty). The horse looks out across the Vale of Pewsey towards the Alton Barnes White Horse on Milk Hill. Pewsey White Horse is visible from Milk Hill, near to Alton Barnes White Horse although not from the exact location of that horse.

Pewsey White Horse is on the outskirts of the village of Pewsey, but nonetheless is considered to be within the village's boundaries. It is the second and so far final piece of public art in the village, following the King Alfred Monument (1913), which was erected in the centre of the village to commemorate the coronation of George VI's predecessor, George V.

== Modern history ==
The Town Flag of Pewsey

The horse has gradually become slightly larger over time. The figure is fenced in to prevent damage from grazing animals, making this one of five Wiltshire White Horses to be fenced in, alongside Alton Barnes White Horse, Cherhill White Horse, Devizes White Horse, and Marlborough White Horse. In either late 1999 or early 2000, an information board was placed above the horse (backed to the fence) giving information on the eight white horses. This was placed after Devizes White Horse had been cut. The edges of the horse are well defined and the chalk is of very small compacted pieces.

The horse is maintained and scoured by the Pewsey 6X Club, who work under the name of the Pewsey Horse Restoration Group. The horse is typically re-chalked (or 'scoured') every eight or ten years. One scouring took place in November 1998 and another in spring 2004. The horse was scoured again by a group of almost 15 people in 2017 to commemorate its 80th birthday. The group firstly cleaned the surface off, then removed weeds and moss with sharp hoes and finally placed fresh chalk on the horse which was partially consolidated with hand-held rammers, leaving rainfall to complete the job. The Pewsey Parish Council rewarded the volunteers with glasses of Prosecco.

In July 2008, Eqvalan, a parasite paste brand for horses, supported the protection of the white horse as part of their 25th anniversary celebrations. Their donation was used to help restore the protective fencing around the horse. In return, Eqvalan were allowed to decorate the horse for a short time as part of their celebrations, adorning the horse with a party hat and placing bunting inside the protective fence.

The Town Flag of Pewsey, registered with the Flag Institute on 18 September 2014, features an illustration of the Pewsey White Horse in the centre. The flag was designed by Eleanor Taylor, with the flag's dark green hills representing Pewsey's rural farming landscape upon which is charged the White Horse, whilst above the horse is the crown to represent King Alfred, who has a statue in the village centre, and who once held land in Pewsey. The oak leaves represent the solidity of the village.

== See also ==
White horses in Wiltshire:

- Alton Barnes White Horse
- Broad Town White Horse
- Cherhill White Horse
- Devizes White Horse
- Hackpen White Horse
- Marlborough White Horse
- Westbury White Horse

Elsewhere:

- Litlington White Horse
