= Hackpen White Horse =

Hill figure in Broad Hinton, Wiltshire, England

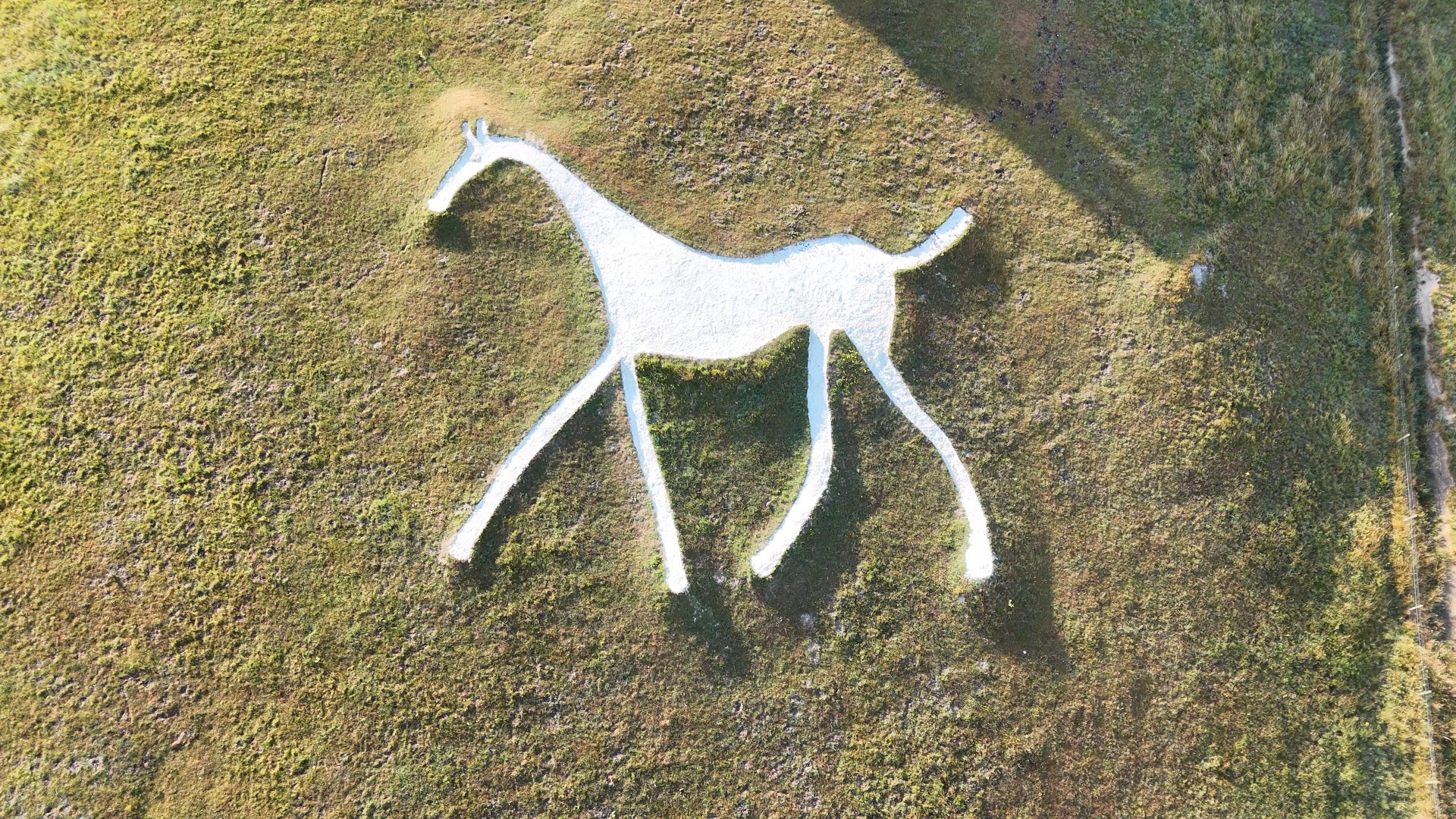
- Hackpen White Horse in 2025

- Location in Wiltshire
- 51°28′21″N 1°49′03″W
- Type: Hill figure monument
- Location: Marlborough Downs, Wiltshire, England

History
- Built: 1838

Site notes
- Material: Chalk
- Height: 27 metres (89 ft)
- Length: 27 metres (89 ft)
- Public access: Yes

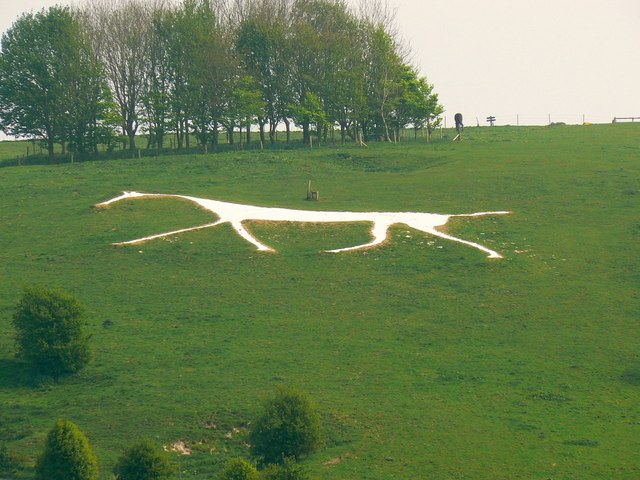
Hackpen White Horse (pictured in 2007).

Hackpen White Horse is a chalk hill figure of a white horse on Hackpen Hill, located below The Ridgeway on the edge of the Marlborough Downs, two miles southeast of Broad Hinton, Wiltshire, England. It is one of eight white horse hill figures located in Wiltshire. It is also known as the Broad Hinton White Horse due to its proximity to the village. Supposedly cut by local parish clerk Henry Eatwell in 1838 to commemorate the coronation of Queen Victoria, the horse is 90 feet (27 m) wide by 90 feet (27 m) high. The horse is regularly scoured and maintained.

== Origins and early history ==
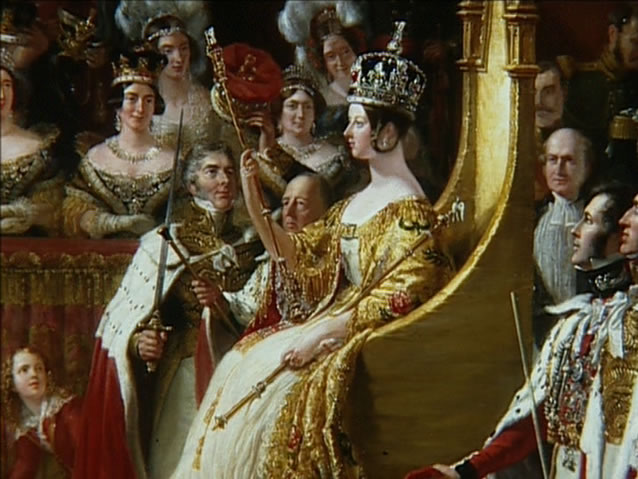
The horse is said to commemorate the coronation of Queen Victoria.

The origin of the horse is uncertain, and is sometimes said to be the only 19th-century white horse to have little of its history known. It is generally regarded that the horse was cut in 1838 by Henry Eatwell, a parish clerk of Broad Hinton, assisted by a local pub landlord. It is said to commemorate the coronation of Queen Victoria.

The original Litlington White Horse is often regarded as the 'sister horse' to the Hackpen White Horse, both having been initially cut in 1838 to honour the coronation of Queen Victoria and being of broadly similar proportions.

== Description and location ==
The horse is cut of chalk, is 90 feet (27 m) square, making it the only square-dimension horse in England, and faces west-northwest. Although Hackpen Hill is high (600 feet (180 m)), it is a gentle slope, especially when compared to the hills of most other Wiltshire horses. Because the hill is gentle, the horse is partly banked up and slightly raised from the surrounding grass to make it more easily visible. The head was initially elevated to help with the foreshortening. The best view of the horse is said to be from the nearby B4041 road, whilst the A361 road near Broad Hinton also provides a clear view.

At the top of the hill is a car park where the Ridgeway crosses the B4041 road, and a footpath stretches from there down to the horse, making the horse accessible to the public. Ironically, many real horses often roam the field. It has been suggested that the stones for Stonehenge and Avebury may have come from a field of sarsen stones just to the southeast of its location. The expression "as different as chalk and cheese" is sometimes believed to refer to the land divided by Hackpen Hill. The hill forms the boundary between the high chalk downs to the south of it and the clay cattle country to the north, where cheese is a product of the milk from the cattle, so the two areas "are as different as chalk and cheese." Hackpen White Horse was not the only hillside shape cut to commemorate Queen Victoria; in 1887, for her Golden Jubilee, a hillside row of trees were planted in the shape of a "V" in Westmeston, Sussex.

The horse ties "neck-and-neck" with Broad Town White Horse as the closest white horse to Swindon.

== Scouring and recent history ==
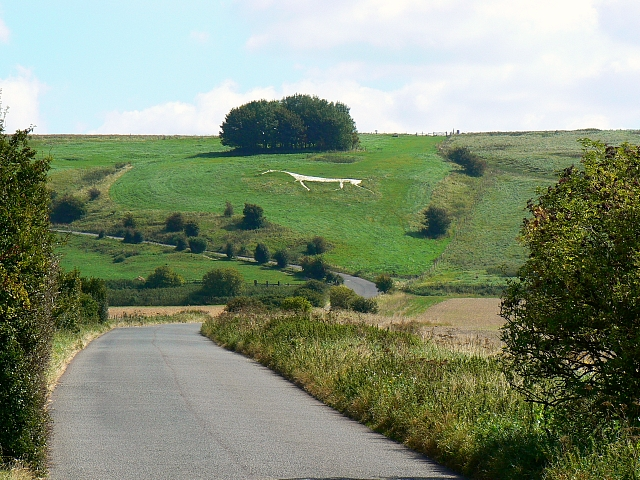
Hackpen White Horse in 2007.

The horse is regularly scoured (cleaned and maintained). In either May or June 2000, John Wain cleaned it single-handedly, taking him some five hours. He later flew David Brewer over the area to photograph the village of Broad Hinton and the white horse for Brewer's book Images of a Wiltshire Downland Village: Broad Hinton and Uffcott. Wain cleaned it annually until Bevan Pope cleaned the horse single-handedly on 23 September 2004. Wain cleaned the horse again with the help of a group of friends on 1 February 2011 and 4 February 2012. On both occasions, they illuminated the newly cleaned horse when the work was completed. Although illuminating a white horse has been a sporadic tradition for other horses in Wiltshire, those occasions marked the first times it had been done for Hackpen White Horse.

In March 2009, the horse was transformed into a "red horse" for the Comic Relief charity's Red Nose Day campaign; this was achieved by covering the horse's shape with numerous red sheets and fabrics. The White Horse pub, located half a mile away in Winterbourne Bassett, features an illustration resembling the horse as its logo. The pub itself was named after the eight horses in Wiltshire.

The horse has also featured in several artworks, including a stained glass window made by Berry Stained Glass, Benoit Philippe's The Hackpen White Horse oil on canvas painting, and a silver necklace created in 2015 by Devizes-based jeweller Daniel Pike. In 2005, the horse appeared in episode 1 of series 6 of Top Gear, and, in 2012, for a Pukka Pies sponsorship advert for ITV travel series Ade in Britain, Pukka Pies modified a photograph of the location to include a hill figure of one of their pies instead of the horse.

== See also ==
- List of hill figures in Wiltshire

Wiltshire white horses

- Westbury White Horse
- Pewsey White Horse
- Devizes White Horse
- Broad Town White Horse
- Cherhill White Horse
- Marlborough White Horse
- Alton Barnes White Horse

Other white horses

- Uffington White Horse
- Osmington White Horse
- Kilburn White Horse
- Woolbury White Horse
- Litlington White Horse
