= Devizes White Horse =

Hill figure in Wiltshire, England

Devizes Millennium White Horse
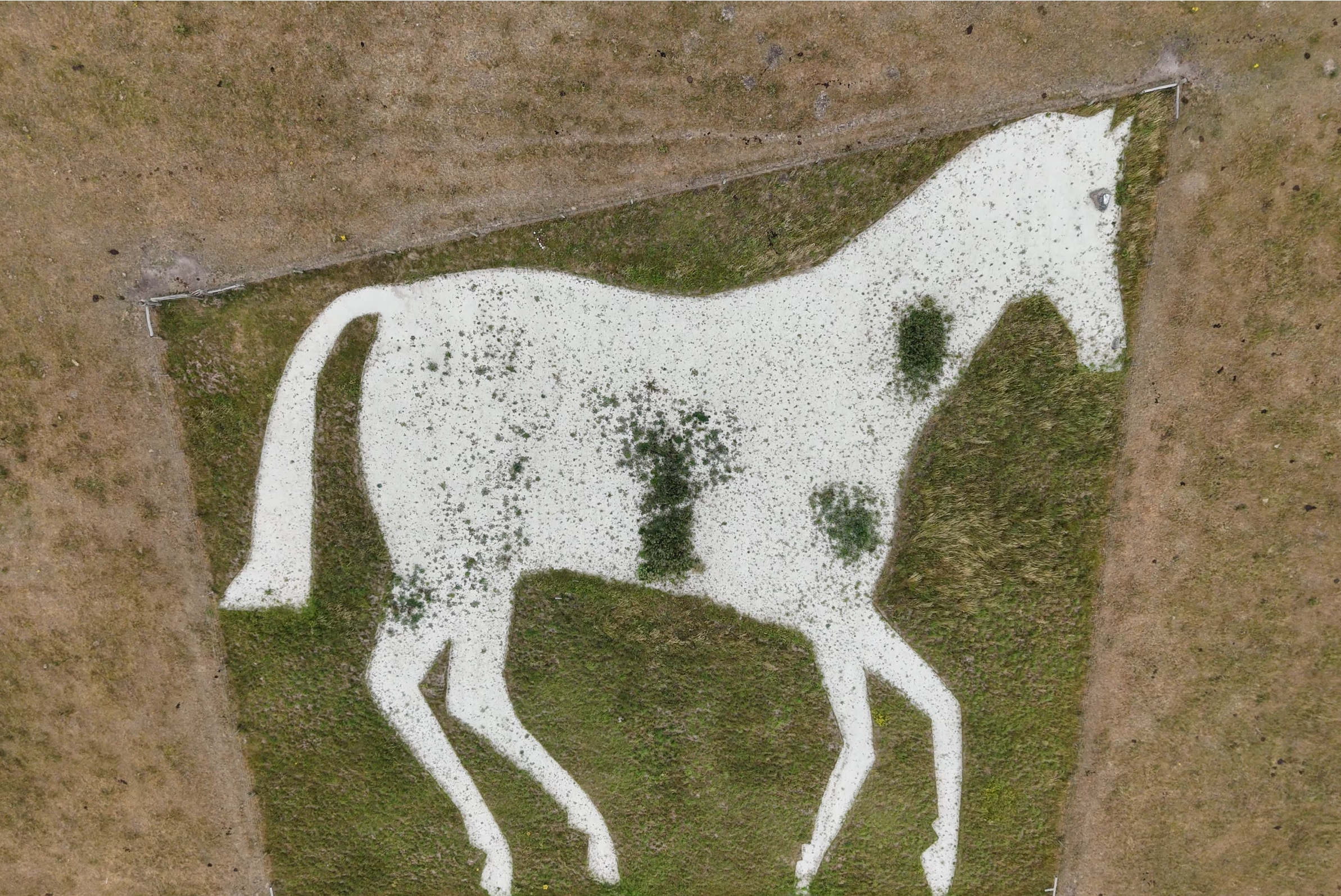
- The Devizes White Horse

- Location in Wiltshire
- 51°22′35″N 1°58′42″W
- Type: Hill figure monument
- Location: Roundway Hill, Wiltshire, England

History
- Built: 1999

Site notes
- Material: Chalk
- Height: 45 metres (148 ft)
- Length: 45.7 metres (150 ft)
- Owner: Crown Estates Commissioners
- Public access: Yes

Devizes White Horse, officially known as the Devizes Millennium White Horse, is a chalk hill figure of a horse located on Bank Field, an escarpment at Roundway Hill, on the outskirts of the town of Devizes above the hamlet of Roundway, Wiltshire, England; it is about ½ mile north of Roundway. It was cut in 1999 to celebrate the forthcoming third millennium, and is based on the design of an earlier white horse hill figure, also known as the Devizes White Horse, or sometimes the Snobs Horse. The earlier horse was very close to the present figure, also on Roundway Hill beneath the Oliver's Castle hill fort. Traces of the Snobs Horse can still be seen under the right conditions.

Devizes White Horse is the eighth and most recent major white horse hill figure cut in Wiltshire that is still visible today, and is 45.7 metres (150 ft) long by 45 metres (148 ft) high. Although sometimes viewed from a skewed angle from nearby roads, the horse can be seen from miles away, including from Bratton Castle on Bratton Downs, home to the Westbury White Horse. It is also visible from the Vale of Pewsey, home to the Pewsey White Horse, where Devizes White Horse and Alton Barnes White Horse can be seen facing each other.

== Origins and history ==
=== Original Devizes White Horse ===
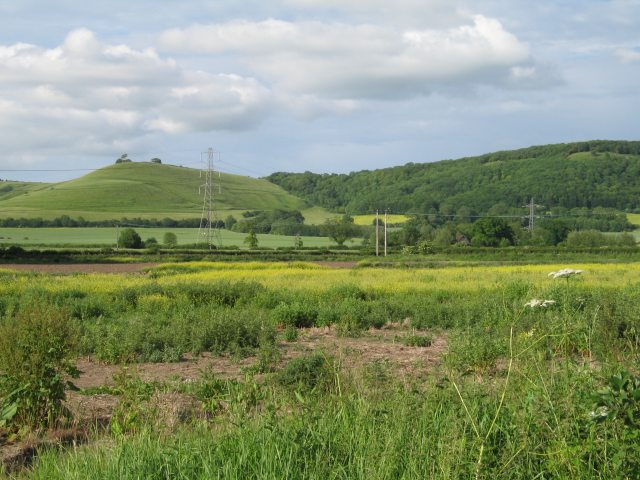
Roundway Hill, the west side of which (pictured) was the location of the original Devizes White Horse

In 1845, local shoemakers cut a white horse into the west side of Roundway Hill, directly beneath the hill fort known as "Oliver's Castle". This was a good location for a hill figure, as it overlooked the valley on a steep slope about 600' above sea level, and could be seen from many miles away. It was known locally as the "Snobs Horse", "snobs" being a local word for shoemakers. It was fitting to cut a hill figure of a horse, as by 1845 there were already white horse hill figures visible in Wiltshire at Westbury, Alton Barnes, Hackpen, Cherhill, near Inkpen, Marlborough and possibly at Broad Town, whose horse is of unknown origin but probably dates from the 19th century, and Rockley, whose horse was "discovered" in 1945, having previously lain under grass. Most of them still exist today, the exceptions being those at Inkpen and Rockley. The Devizes horse was neglected and was lost in about 1922, and no dimensions of the horse seem to have ever been recorded. However, different colouration of the grass could still be seen.

In 1954, James Smith, then head boy of Devizes Grammar School, was out cycling and believed he saw the outline of a horse on the Oliver Cromwell promontory. His observations were checked, and the faint outline of the head, neck and rump of a horse could indeed be seen. This was the old Snobs Horse. A sketch of the horse was drawn and was later used for the design of the modern 1999 Devizes Millennium White Horse, except reversed: the Millennium White Horse faces right, making it the only white horse in Wiltshire to do so, whereas the Snobs Horse sketch faced left. Attempts to remake the figure at this point in 1954 were unsuccessful, as were previous attempts in 1909 and 1939, when the horse was also reported to have been seen, and later attempts in 1977, 1987 and finally 1998, when its head and neck reappeared.

In 1979, freak lighting conditions and fine snow brought the outline of the horse's neck and head into view for the first time since 1954. The head and neck have been seen regularly since, including in 1998, 2000 and 2005, the latter two occasions being after the creation of the Millennium White Horse. Whenever any part of it has reappeared, it seems to suggest that the horse was small, roughly half the size of the Millennium White Horse. Its regular reappearances are due to its method of construction, trenching, which is by far the most common method of hill figure construction. As the underlying chalk was not near the surface, a trench was dug and chalk from another site was used to fill it. This invasive method of construction allows traces of the figure to be seen even after it has been overgrown for many years.

=== Devizes Millennium White Horse ===
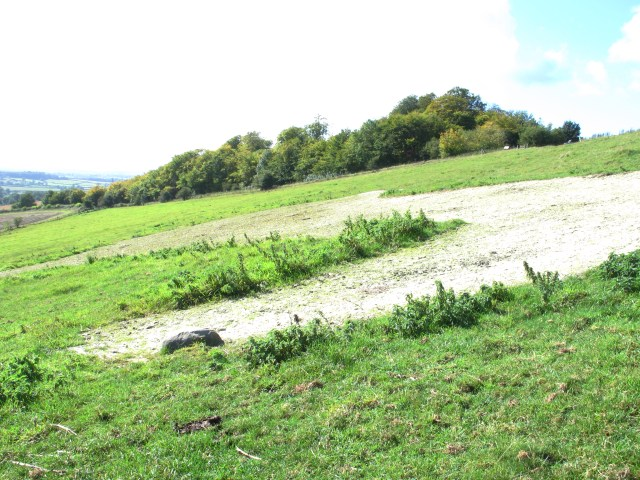
The nose of the horse, showing the rock used for its nostril

In 1998, a newcomer to Devizes, Sarah Padwick, apparently inspired by the other seven surviving white horses in Wiltshire, sent a letter to a local newspaper suggesting that a white horse should be cut on Roundway Hill to celebrate the millennium. She was unaware of the nearby Snobs Horse. The newspaper liked the idea and plans followed. The original plan was to recut the Snobs Horse in its original location, following the attempted revival in 1998. This proved unsuccessful because the site was declared a Site of Special Scientific Interest. However, a local farmer, Chris Combe, offered his land on Roundway Hill as an alternative site, provided permission was granted by the Crown Estates Commissioners, who own the land. Wiltshire County Council Tourism supported the project, as did Roundway Parish Council, which supported the planning application made to Kennet District Council. This became the new location of the horse. The design was based on James Smith's 1954 drawing, but reversed so that the horse faced right. The design also depicted the horse in motion, whereas the other Wiltshire white horses are shown standing.

A committee, the Cavaliers of the Devizes Millennium White Horse, was set up to oversee the project, and members of the public were invited to join. The group was also formed to support its future maintenance. Alan Truscott, of Sarsens Housing, joined the committee as the member in charge of surveying and pegging out the figure on the hill, while Keith Saunders of Pearce Civil Engineering joined to provide the machinery and manpower to clear the topsoil and infill the chalk after the outline had been cut. The outline itself was cut by hand by various groups and individuals from the local community. Two hundred people helped cut the figure. It was anticipated that the project would promote Devizes, its ancient heritage and the attractive surrounding countryside, as well as add a feature to the area's tourist map.

The digging of the horse's outline took place over the weekend of 18–19 September 1999. The 200 people taking part were asked to dig one metre in length, the total length of the horse being approximately 230 m. On 20 September, the site was closed so that Pearce Civil Engineering could dig out the body of the horse over several days. They also positioned the rocks used as the horse's eye and nostril. Devizes White Horse was completed on 29 September 1999.

== Scouring and maintenance ==
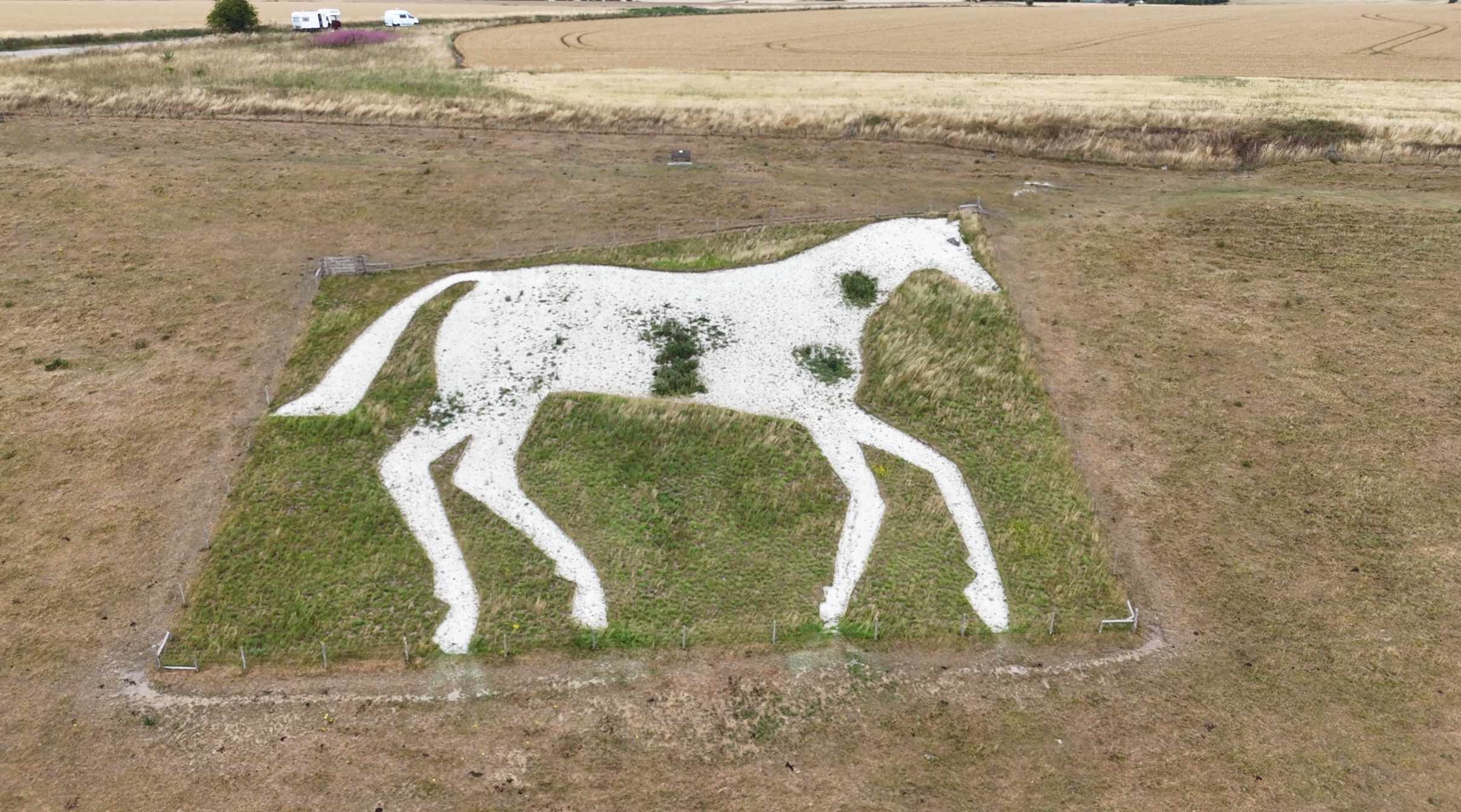
The horse in 2025 with weeds visible, making it look like a pinto horse

Devizes White Horse has occasionally fallen into disrepair, with weed growth being the main threat to the site. A Beckhampton local, comparing the state of the Devizes horse in 2007 with the then-recently cleaned Westbury White Horse, was quoted by the Gazette and Herald as saying: "What a shame that the civic pride which led to this White Horse being created to celebrate the Millennium does not seem to have lasted longer than the first couple of years of that Millennium." The first major clean-up, or scouring, of the horse subsequently took place over two days in April 2007, when Padwick invited volunteers to remove weeds, grasses and moss from the figure.

By September 2008, the horse had again become barely visible. The Devizes Millennium White Horse Committee began seeking funds to scour the horse. These scouring plans were then passed to the Probation Service Community Service Group, which subsequently gave the horse a thorough clean, a task it has since repeated regularly. In August 2014, a writer for the Wiltshire Times complained about the then-current condition of the horse, noting its badly overgrown chalk surface and that the figure appeared "grey and blotchy from a distance. Usually, in the dry of summer, the chalk looks lovely and white." The writer also noted that "the gravel pathway leading to the mobility gate [was] so overgrown that no wheel or pushchair could go through to the seat in the field", and expressed the hope that Roundway Parish Council "would consider some urgent maintenance."

In 2026 a further scouring was done by local volunteers using up to 30 tonnes of local chalk. The work was supported by National Grid who were in the process of removing 13 pylons and replacing almost three miles of overhead line with underground cables to enhance the local landscape.

== Modern history ==
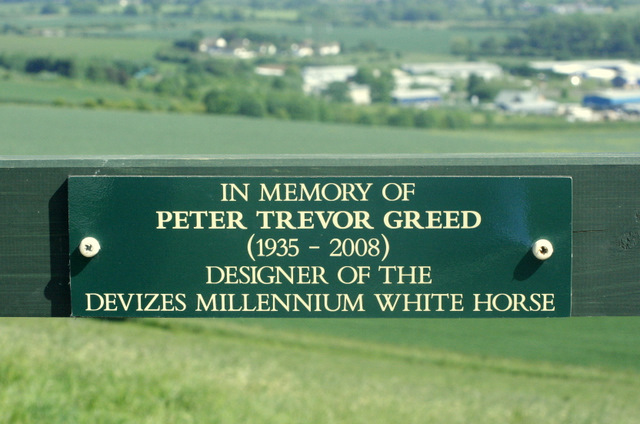
The plaque on the entrance gate on the hill to the horse's designer, Peter Greed, who died in 2008

Devizes White Horse is affectionately nicknamed "Chalkie" by locals. Shortly after its completion, it was included alongside the other seven canonical Wiltshire white horses on the 90-mile walking route Wiltshire's White Horse Trail, better known simply as the White Horse Trail, which visits all eight canonical white horses in Wiltshire. The trail was established in 2000 by the Wiltshire Tourism Board. Padwick praised the trail, writing that "A lot of people are interested in doing recreational activities like this and taking on lesser and greater degrees of walking." Since 2006, Devizes White Horse has been the starting point for an annual charity event known as the White Horse Challenge, in which participants complete the full 52-mile walk around the eight canonical Wiltshire white horses to raise money for Wiltshire Air Ambulance.

The horse featured at the centre of the logo for Roundway Parish Council, which was concerned that Roundway was being mistaken for "a mere adjacent for Devizes", and launched the logo in 2011 to help distinguish the settlement from Devizes. Roundway Parish Council merged with Devizes Town Council in 2017, although Roundway's last chairman, Chris Callow, spoke proudly of the parish council's achievements, including its role in helping with the cutting of Devizes White Horse. Peter Greed, who designed the millennium horse, died after a long illness in November 2008 at the age of 73, and is commemorated with a plaque on the entrance gate to Bank Field.

=== Celebrations ===
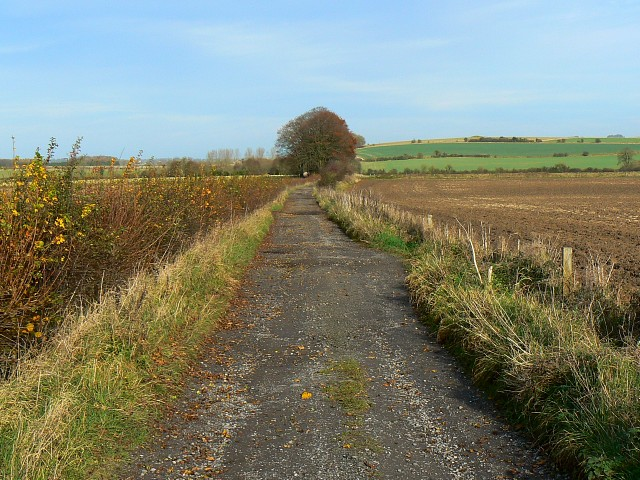
The White Horse Trail running near the Devizes horse in Beckhampton

Further celebrating the millennium, a time capsule was buried beneath the horse on 31 December 1999 with help from Pearce Civil Engineering, and the horse was floodlit the same night from dusk until dawn on 1 January 2000. The time capsule, co-donated by Wessex Water, was filled with items of local interest, while the floodlighting of the horse could be seen from miles away. The horse was lit again on 30 June 2012 when, as part of the Ageas Salisbury International Arts Festival, both Devizes White Horse and the nearby Alton Barnes White Horse were illuminated by lantern parades. More than 300 lanterns were placed around the Devizes horse, and it was lit from 10 pm to midnight.

On 10 October 2009, to celebrate the horse's tenth anniversary, locals, including the Mayor of Devizes, walked onto the horse to form a human "10" figure. A light aircraft from GS Aviation flew over the figure to take an aerial photograph. To celebrate the horse's 13th birthday in autumn 2012, local residents Thelma and Colin Edwards decided to stage a picnic on the hill, inviting local community members and others involved in cutting the horse. The ceremony was hosted by Sarah Padwick and Kelvin Nash, the Mayor of Devizes, and involved children bringing flowers to create a garland for the white horse's neck. A scout group in Devizes celebrated St George's Day in 2017 by sprucing up and weeding the white horse.

=== Replica ===
To celebrate its tenth anniversary in 2012, Nursteed School in Devizes unveiled a small replica of the Millennium Horse on its grounds. This horse was constructed over several months by volunteers, including staff and students, and is a tenth of the size of the original. A small number 10 was initially placed on the horse, resembling the human "10" figure formed by volunteers on the original millennium white horse in 2009 to celebrate its tenth birthday.

== See also ==
- List of hill figures in Wiltshire

=== Other white horses ===
Miles are road distances from a road near Roundway Hill Covert.

- Alton Barnes White Horse (7 road miles away using Horton Road)
- Broad Town White Horse (15.2 road miles away)
- Cherhill White Horse (10 road miles away using the A361)
- Hackpen White Horse (14.7 road miles away)
- Kilburn White Horse (North Yorkshire) (256 miles away)
- Litlington White Horse (East Sussex) (147.7 road miles away)
- Marlborough White Horse (14.2 road miles away)
- Osmington White Horse (Dorset) (70.2 road miles away)
- Pewsey White Horse (14.2 road miles away)
- Uffington White Horse (Oxfordshire) (30.2 road miles away)
- Westbury White Horse (14.3 road miles away)
- Woolbury White Horse (36.4 miles away)

=== Other hill figures ===
- Bulford Kiwi (22 road miles away)
- Cerne Abbas Giant (59 road miles away)
- Fovant Badges (31 road miles away)
- Lamb Down Military Badge (20 road miles away)
- Solsbury Hill turf maze (20 road miles away)
- The Mizmaze (43 road miles away)
