= Alton Barnes White Horse =

Hill figure in Alton, United Kingdom

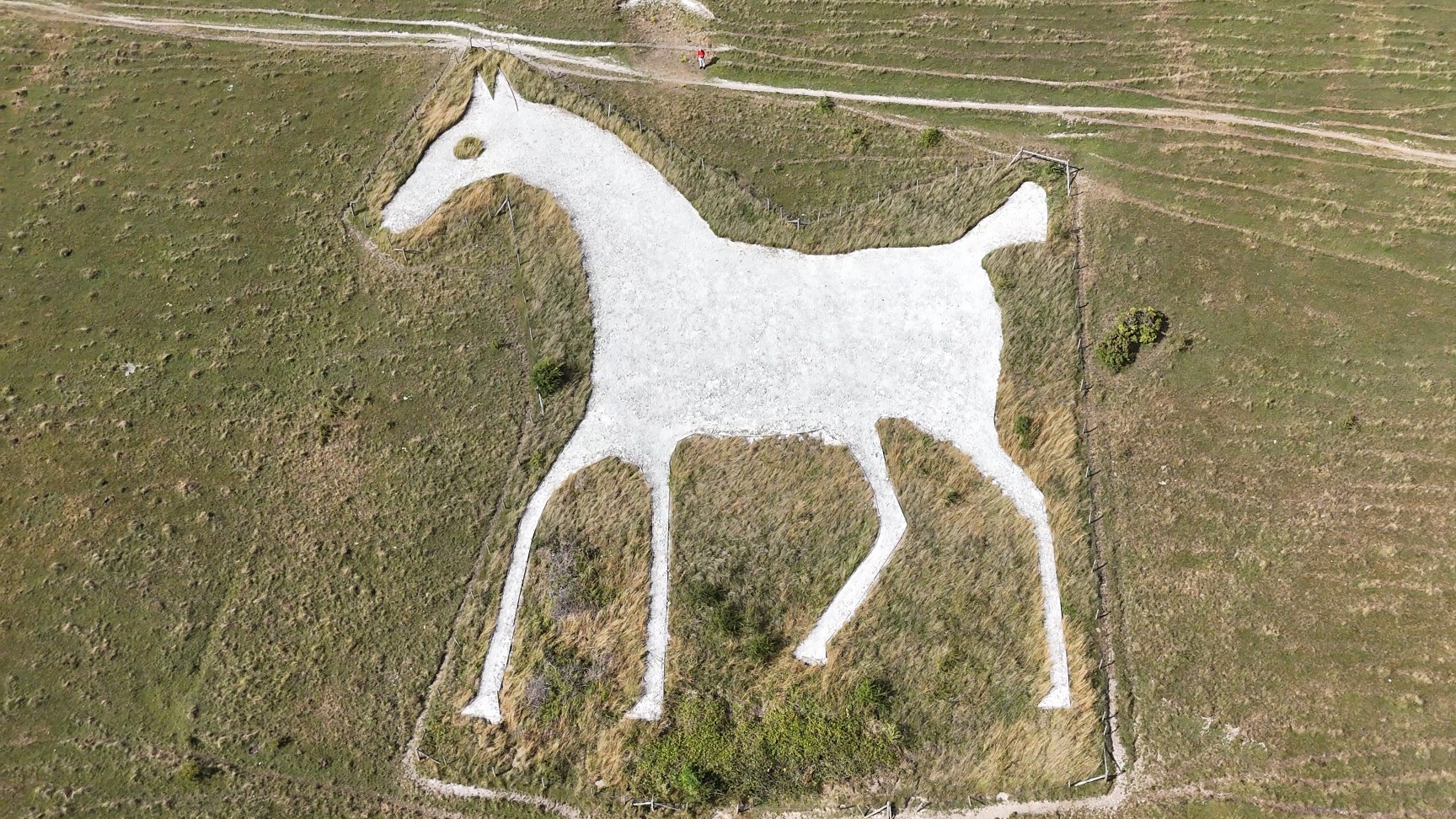
- The horse in 2025

- Location in Wiltshire
- 51°22′21″N 1°50′53″W
- Type: Hill figure monument
- Location: Milk Hill, Wiltshire, England

History
- Built: 1812

Site notes
- Material: Chalk
- Height: 55 metres (180 ft)
- Length: 49 metres (161 ft)
- Public access: Yes

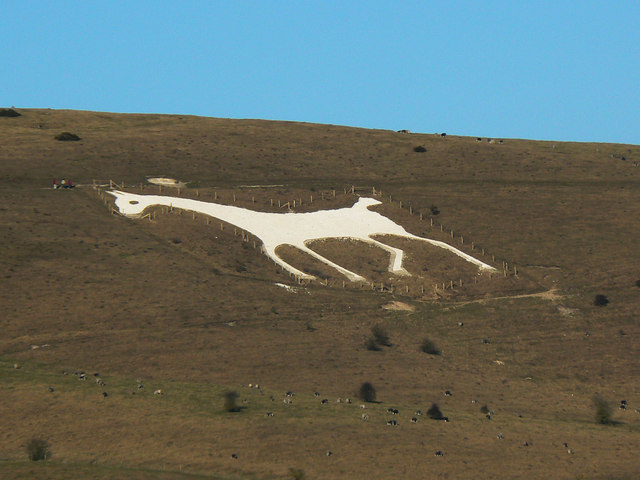
Alton Barnes White Horse from the southwest in 2010

Alton Barnes White Horse is a chalk hill figure of a white horse located on Milk Hill, some 914 yards, 1,000 metres, north of the village of Alton Barnes, Wiltshire, England. The horse is approximately 180 feet high and 160 feet long, and was cut in 1812, commissioned by local farmer Robert Pile. Pile instructed inn sign painter John Thorne to design and cut the horse, although Thorne conned Pile by leaving with his advance sum while employing local resident John Harvey to cut the horse instead. It is based on another white horse hill figure in Wiltshire, the Cherhill White Horse, and is the second largest of the eight white horses in Wiltshire.

One of the county's best-loved and most iconic white horses, it remains a tourist attraction and has been regularly maintained, with numerous groups or individuals scouring the horse throughout its life. More recently, the horse was illuminated by candles every winter solstice for over ten years, as well as in a lantern parade to celebrate its 200th anniversary in 2012. The horse has also been transformed into a zebra on April Fools' Day on two occasions.

== Description and location ==
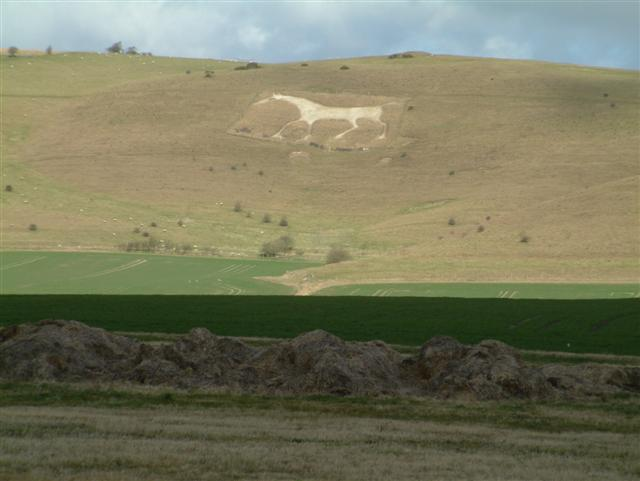
Alton Barnes White Horse in 2006

Alton Barnes White Horse is located on the southern, 35° slope of Milk Hill, also known locally as "Old Adam," the tallest hill in Wiltshire with a 295 metre high peak. The horse is sited on the ridge which connects Milk Hill to Walker's Hill, overlooking Pewsey Vale; the land is part of the Pewsey Down Nature Reserve. The figure is visible for 22 miles, but particularly good road views of it can be seen from the Honey Street canal bridge, the Alton Priors road, and the Lockeridge road which approaches the white horse itself. One of the furthest views of the horse on a clear day is said to be from Old Sarum near Salisbury. The horse can be reached via a footpath from a nearby parking space and from atop the hill. A fence is erected around the horse to prevent damage from wild animals and tourists. The figure is near two Iron Age hill forts, located atop Milk Hill and the nearby Walker's Hill, and the Adam's Grave long barrow.

The chalk horse is 166 feet (51 metres) tall and 160 feet (49 metres) wide, and, to prevent foreshortening, is disproportionately tall. It is based on and is said to resemble the nearby Cherhill White Horse, cut in 1780, although the Alton Barnes horse is slightly larger. It is possible the horse was bigger in the past, as Revd E.H.M. Sladen, measuring the horse in 1868 when he was the village's incumbent, claimed the horse was 180 feet high and 165 feet wide. Author Paul Newman describes the horse's appearance as distinctive, "with its docked tail and trotting stance." 1920s poet and essayist E.V. Lucas described the horse as having "a swan-like neck and penetrating eye." Over the years, the shape of the horse has been altered considerably, with its eye becoming larger, its neck becoming more thinned, the shape of its legs being improved and the addition of lips and ears, despite only an outline of ears being present in the horse's originally proposed design.

== Origins ==
Alton Barnes White Horse was cut in 1812 on the instructions of one Robert Pile or Pyle, a tenant of Manor Farm, in the village of Alton Barnes. This may be the same Robert Pile who cut the original version of the nearby Pewsey White Horse in 1785, or perhaps his son, given that the Alton Barnes horse was created 27 years later. Selecting the southern slope of Milk Hill for the horse, Pile contacted a journeyman inn sign painter, John Thorne, also known as Jack the Painter, to design and cut the horse, and paid him an advance sum of £20. Pile and Thorne agreed that the white horse would be excavated to a depth of 1 foot (0.3 m) and subsequently packed with chalk rubble. Thorne provided Pile with a sketch of the proposed horse, sketched from the Honey Street canal bridge; it resembled Cherhill White Horse and its walking pose, except with ears which were only outlined with chalk.

However, although Thorne was supposed to create the horse himself, he discreetly employed another man, Stanton St Bernard resident John Harvey, to do the turf-stripping and digging, and after Harvey had gone about his task and the horse's outline was clearly visible, Thorne ran away, taking his £20 advance with him. According to contrasting accounts, Pile either had to pay Harvey a similar sum to finish the work, or was left to complete the horse himself. Thorne was later caught and hanged for a series of crimes. According to Paul Newman, author of Lost Gods of Albion, Thorne's Bohemian background and mischievous intent when asked to cut the horse has cemented him as a unique figure within the history of hill figures: "Although one cannot applaud John Thorne for his less than scrupulous attitude towards the duties he had undertaken, he has enlivened the annals of turf-cutting by bringing to this eccentric art a low, Bohemian shiftiness, pleasantly at variance with the solid trustworthiness of the squires and local worthies so often encountered in the histories of these figures."

== Maintenance and scouring ==
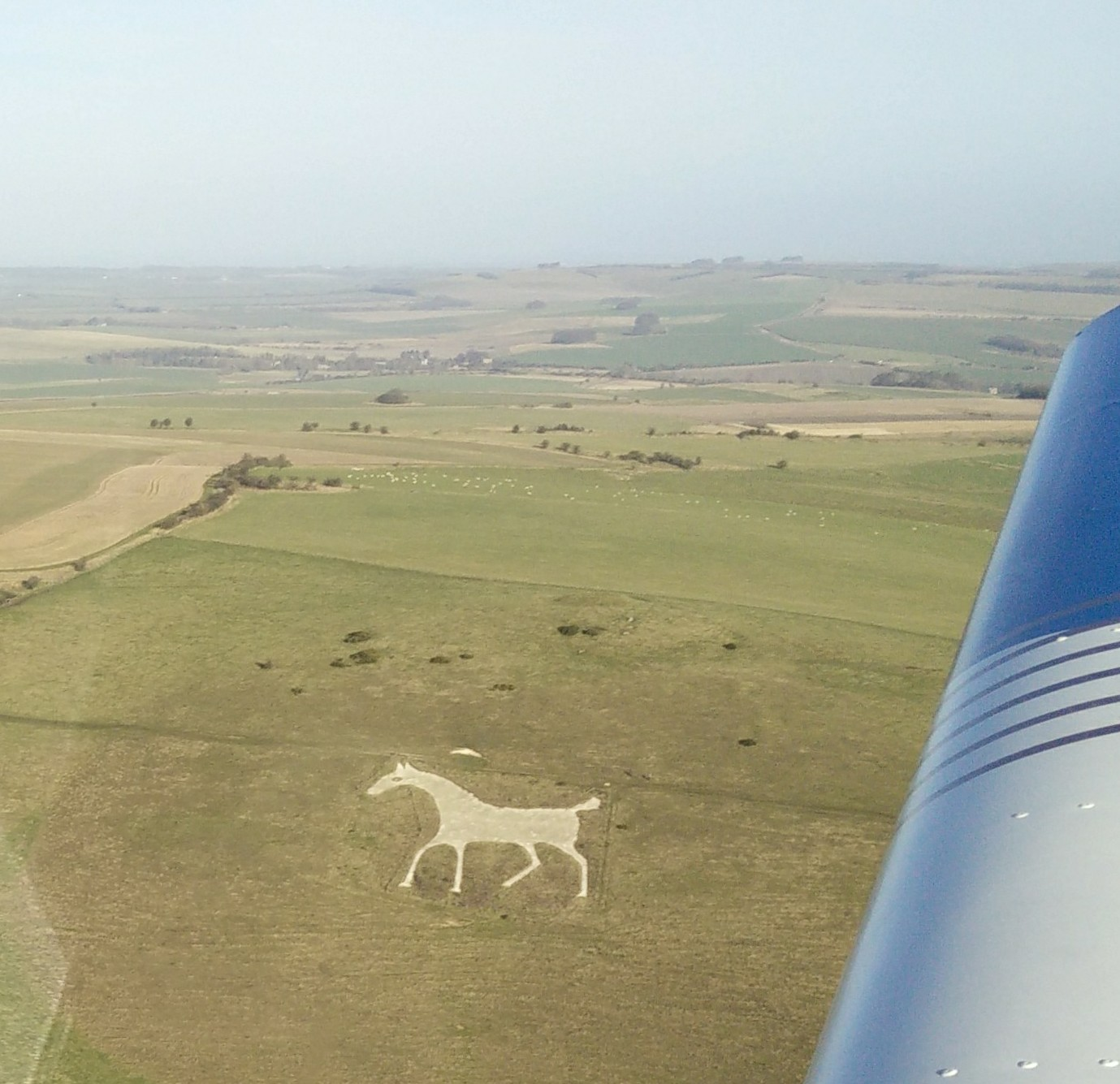
The horse from the air in 2015

Having been scoured regularly since it was cut, Alton Barnes White Horse has been well looked after. According to author Esther Smith, "at times, this horse has fallen into disrepair but it has always had just enough attention to keep it from disappearing altogether." Those responsible for scouring the horse have changed over time, as some work in the mid-19th century was paid for by subscription, and Scouts, Guides and local organizations have also scoured the horse. On one occasion in 1866, a chalk pit was dug above the horse's head by the scourers, presumably so that they did not need to transport the chalk from further afield. According to Smith, writing in 2004, "this was a mistake as the pit never really grew over again properly and can still be seen quite clearly." During World War II, the horse was successfully concealed to hide it from the German air force.

The horse was scoured in 1987 with the aid of army helicopters helping to fly in fresh chalk. By 2009, the horse was losing its shape and had browned slightly, so at an estimated cost of £21,000, the Alton Barnes Parish Council and landowner Tim Carson gave the horse a full restoration in September and October 2009, where a helicopter ferried 150 tonnes of fresh chalk, quarried in south Wiltshire, to the horse, giving it a fresh coat in time for its 2012 bicentenary. As parish councillor Steve Hepworth, who worked on the project, explained, the helicopter was necessary as lorries were not allowed to transport chalk, because the horse stands "in the middle of a Site of Special Scientific Interest on a national nature reserve with European protection. Natural England controls the management of the land and as part of that management there is no vehicular access."

In July and August 2019, the horse was scoured by a group of hundreds of people from many nations, using some 46 tonnes of pristine chalk flown in by an RAF Chinook helicopter. Led by Rob Sutherland, the work was initially hampered by driving rain and high winds, but the scouring was completed with help from local school students and their parents.

== Modern history ==
One of the best known white horse hill figures in Wiltshire, Alton Barnes White Horse "remains a prominent landmark visible from the Pewsey Vale," and has been described as being "well-loved." It features in the 1995 music video for "Staying Out for the Summer" by British band Dodgy, and in numerous artworks, including one by landscape artist Anna Dillon and another painted in 1996 by Graham Arnold which is housed in Wiltshire Museum. In the neighbouring village of Alton Priors, there is a sarsen stone with the design of Alton Barnes White Horse carved into it. The white horse is part of several tours, including the 90-mile walking tour 'Wiltshire's White Horse Trail', better known as simply the White Horse Trail, which visits all eight of the canonical white horses in Wiltshire. On 10 May 2011, the hill became the starting point for the record-breaking longest hand-gliding flight recorded in the UK.

=== Celebrations ===
From 2001 to 2012, the white horse was annually illuminated every Winter Solstice by the Wiltshire Crop Circle Study Group, typically on the actual day of the solstice (21 December), except in 2003 when it was not lit at all. This was achieved by a small group of people placing tea lights in jars and arranging them around the outline of the white horse. For example, over 400 candles and jars were used in 2009. Melanie Gambrill, one of the events' organisers, said "it must be amazing to watch the horse being lit from a distance, as the lighting progresses up to the horse's head, along the tail until its completely aglow." In 2001, the jars were placed on their sides to provide protection from the wind and rain, and the effect was described as "dramatic" as the horse continued to be lit late into the evening despite the wind extinguishing a few of the lights. In 2009, the horse was covered in snow when it was illuminated, leading to a "quite spectacular" effect.

On 30 June 2012, in a temporary art installation by Dave Chadwick and Yorkshire-based art group pa-BOOM, the white horse was lit up in a lantern parade to celebrate the horse's 200th anniversary, and also as part of the Ageas Salisbury International Arts Festival; the nearby Devizes White Horse was also lit in a lantern parade at the same time. Maria Bota, the organiser of the event, said "I came to the county four years ago and discovered these white horses scattered around the landscape - often in beautiful settings. What we want to do is put a bit of a spotlight on them and enable people to discover them and discover the landscape they're set in." Approximately 100 spectators watched from Mark Hill as the horse was illuminated in several different fashions, "first its body in swirling patterns of brilliant white lights, and then its outline in the warm glow of yellow flame," before finishing in a firework display.

=== Pranks and vandalism ===
For April Fool's Day in 2003 and 2014, the horse was temporarily transformed into a zebra by pranksters, which in the latter case was achieved by pinning black stripes, made from plastic sheeting, across the horse, and giving the figure a black nose. Many people took photos of the 2014 zebra transformation before the pranksters returned to the hill that evening and removed the additions, unlike in 2003 when the pranksters left landowner Tim Carson to remove the additions. The horse was vandalised in March 2008 when pranksters added a penis to the horse, which, although amusing passing motorists, worried the landowner Tim Carson who scours the horse who was unsure if the damage would be permanent. A local newspaper described the vandalism as turning the horse "into a stallion," and described the horse as "having gained an extra 'limb'."

In October 2019, climate change activist group Extinction Rebellion created a piece of "flash art" by placing an extinction symbol made from old T-shirts on the horse. Critics felt the stunt was "disrespectful" to the horse, with Wiltshire Council leader Philip Whitehead criticising it on Twitter, while others defended it and spoke of its temporary nature. The group said they intended to remove the symbol without trace by daybreak, saying in a Facebook post: "Let’s be clear, this was by no means an illegal act. We did not vandalise nor deface what is a beautiful chalk monument on the soil of our local community. We too love the White Horse, and it is because of that love that we chose to do it."

== See also ==
- Alton Barnes
- Hill figure
- List of hill figures in Wiltshire

Wiltshire White Horses

- Broad Town White Horse
- Cherhill White Horse
- Devizes White Horse
- Hackpen White Horse
- Marlborough White Horse
- Pewsey White Horse
- Westbury White Horse

Other White Horses

- Litlington White Horse
