= List of hill figures in Wiltshire =

This is a list of hill figures in Wiltshire (ranked by age).

== White horse figures ==
The White Horse Flag, an unofficial flag of Wiltshire depicting the Cherhill White Horse.

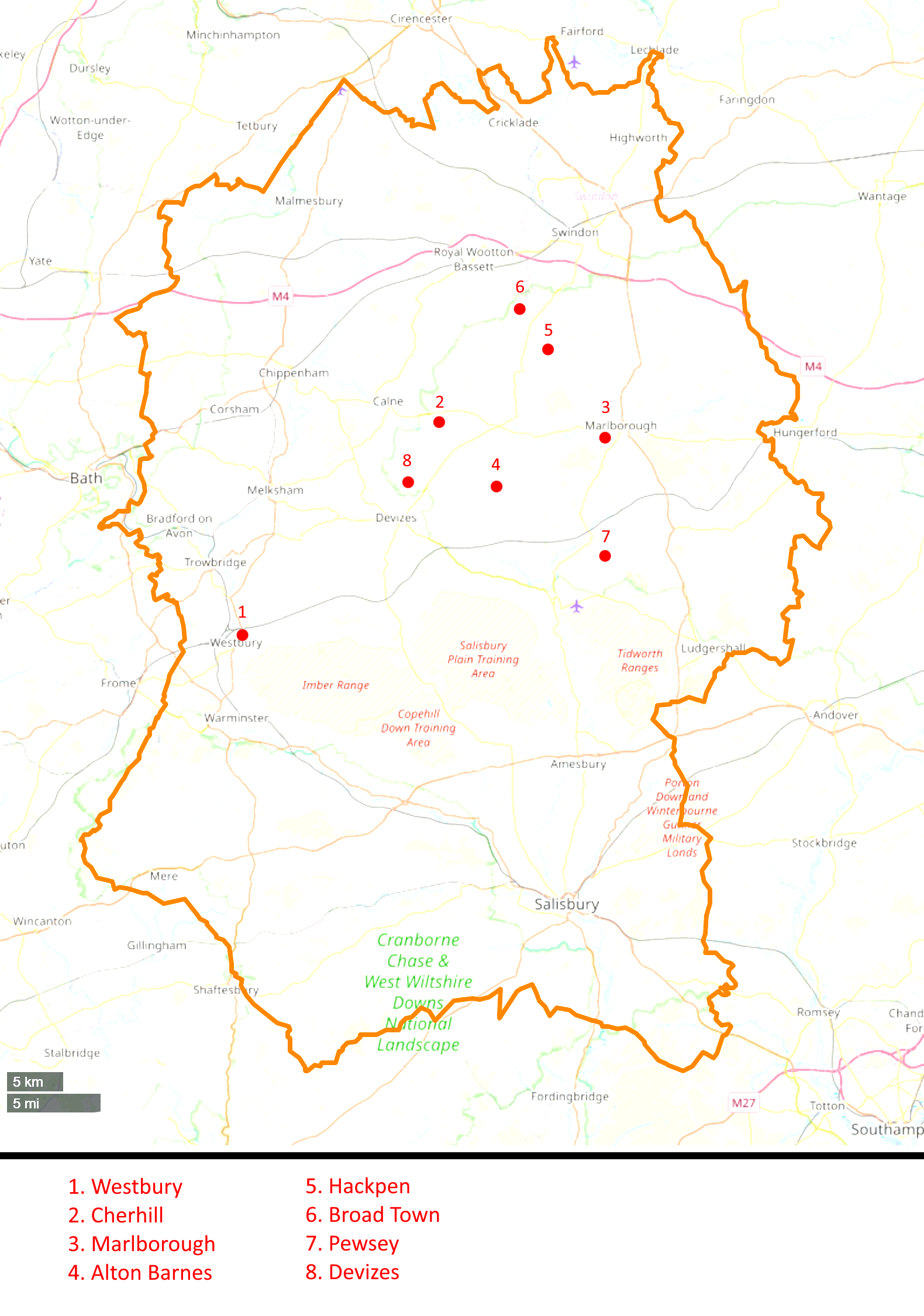
Map of the white horses within Wiltshire (all except Westbury and Pewsey lie in the northern half of the county)

Rank	Name	Location	Coordinates	Created	Age (years)	Width	Height	Image
1	Westbury White Horse	Westbury	51.2635°N 2.1469°W	1778	248	166 feet (51 m)	163 feet (50 m)	
2	Cherhill White Horse	Cherhill	51.4251°N 1.9297°W	1780	246	165 feet (50 m)	120 feet (37 m)	
3	Marlborough White Horse	Preshute	51.4127°N 1.7375°W	1804	222	62 feet (19 m)	47 feet (14 m)	
4	Alton Barnes White Horse	Alton Barnes, near Alton	51.3726°N 1.8480°W	1812	214	160 feet (49 m)	180 feet (55 m)	
5	Hackpen White Horse	Broad Hinton	51.4724°N 1.8175°W	1838	188	90 feet (27 m)	90 feet (27 m)	
6	Broad Town White Horse	Broad Town	51.5033°N 1.8591°W	1864	162	80 feet (24 m)	60 feet (18 m)	
7	Pewsey White Horse	Pewsey	51.3212°N 1.7566°W	1937	89	66 feet (20 m)	45 feet (14 m)	
8	Devizes White Horse	Roundway	51.3763°N 1.9784°W	1999	27	150 feet (46 m)	148 feet (45 m)	

== Military figures ==
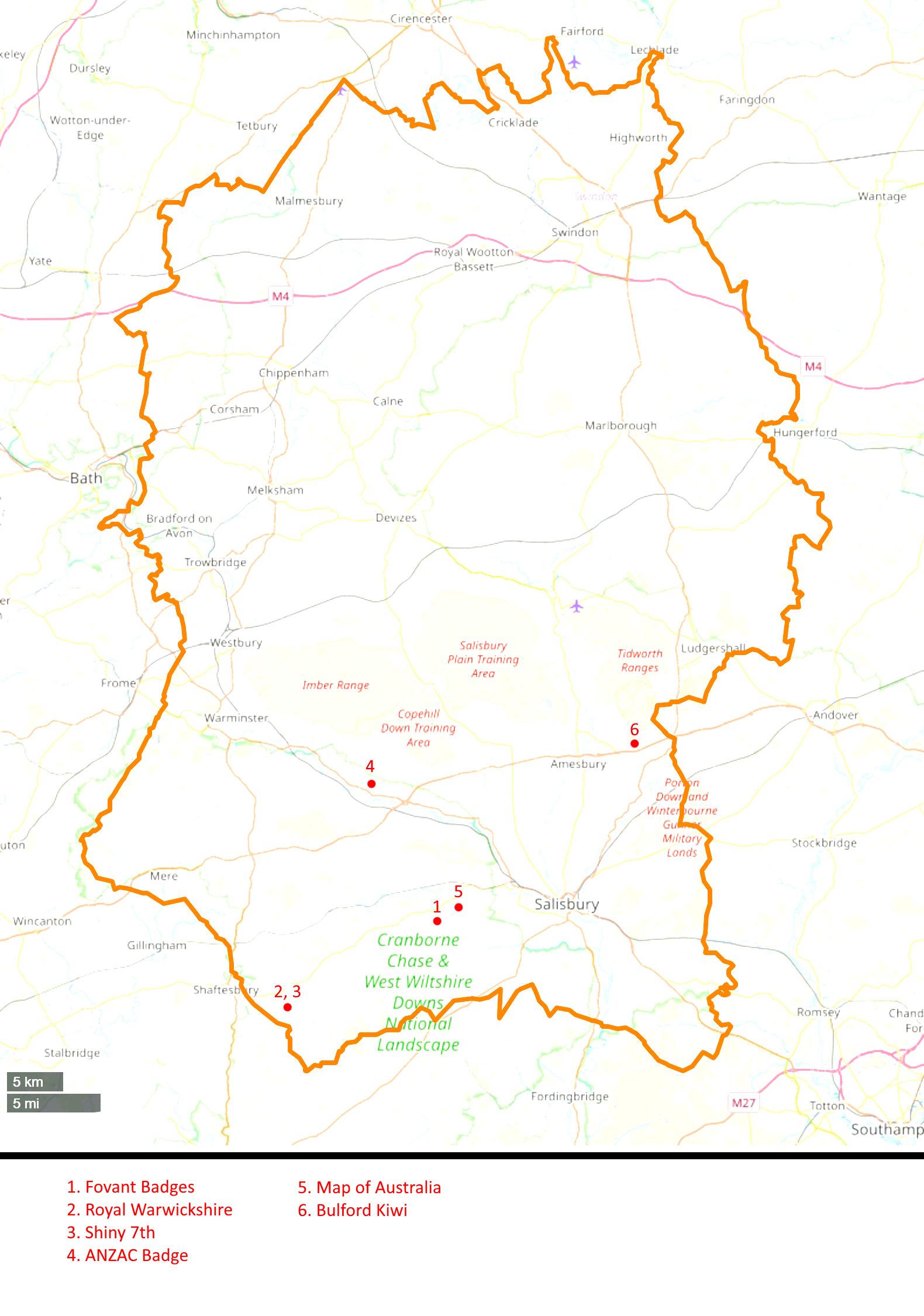
Map of the military figures within Wiltshire (all lie in the southern half of the county)

Rank	Name	Location	Coordinates	Created	Age (years)	Width	Height	Image
1	Fovant Badges	Fovant	51.0539°N 1.9791°W	1916	110	Approx. 1,804 feet (550 m) as the crow flies from left-most badge to right-most one	Largest badge has a height of approx. 131 feet (40 m)	
2	Royal Warwickshire Badge	Sutton Mandeville	51.0429°N 2.0249°W	1916	110	Approx. 328 feet (100 m)	Approx. 213 feet (65 m)	
3	Shiny 7th Badge	Sutton Mandeville	51.0421°N 2.0223°W	1916	110	Approx. 36 feet (11 m)	Approx. 66 feet (20 m)	
4	Lamb Down Military Badge (ANZAC badge)	Codford	51.1537°N 2.0245°W	1916–17	109	175 feet (53 m)	150 feet (46 m)	
5	Map of Australia	Compton Down, near Compton Chamberlayne	51.0618°N 1.9400°W	1917	109	210 feet (64 m)	About 178 feet (54 m)	
6	Bulford Kiwi	Bulford	51.1941°N 1.7151°W	1919	107	About 130 feet (40 m)	About 460 feet (140 m)	

== Others ==
Rank	Name	Location	Coordinates	Created	Age (years)	Width	Height	Image
1	Tame Buzzard Line	New Art Centre, East Winterslow, Salisbury	51.1047°N 1.6441°W	2001	25	2.3 feet (0.7 m)	115 feet (35.1 m)	
2	Pterry the Pterodactyl	Upavon Golf Club	51.2941°N 1.7825°W	c. 2000–2020		About 45 feet (14 m)	About 38 feet (12 m)	
3	Devizes White Horse replica	Nursteed School, Devizes		2012	14	About 15 feet (5 m)	About 14.8 feet (5 m)	

== Former figures ==
Rank	Name	Location	Created	Lost	Width	Height	Image
1	Former Westbury White Horse	Westbury	Before 1742	1778	100 feet (30 m)	"near 100 feet" (30 m)	
2	Former Pewsey White Horse	Pewsey	1785	1937	43 feet (13 m)	Unknown	
3	Former Devizes White Horse	Devizes	1845	Around 1922	Unknown	Unknown	
4	Ham Hill or Inkpen White Horse	Ham Hill near Inkpen, Berkshire	1860s	Unknown	Unknown	Unknown	
5	Finsbury Rifles Hurdcott Badge	Barford St Martin	1910s	Unknown			
6	Rockley White Horse	Rockley	Discovered 1948	20th century	126 feet (38 m)	66 feet (20 m)	
7	Laverstock Panda	Laverstock	1969	1980s	55 feet (17 m)	55 feet (17 m)	
8	Marlborough Arrow	Marlborough	1969	1969			
9	Tan Hill Donkey	Tan Hill	Unknown	1970s	75 feet (23 m)	Unknown	
10	Mock white horse on Battlesbury Hill	Warminster	2006	2006			

== See also ==
- Bloemfontein, a city in South Africa where Wiltshire troops are believed to have cut the Bloemontein White Horse around 1900, resulting in "the only Wiltshire white horse, that is not in Wiltshire"
- Liddington, a village near Swindon once considered for a white horse.
- List of public art in Wiltshire
