= Broad Town White Horse =

Hill figure in Broad Town, Wiltshire, England

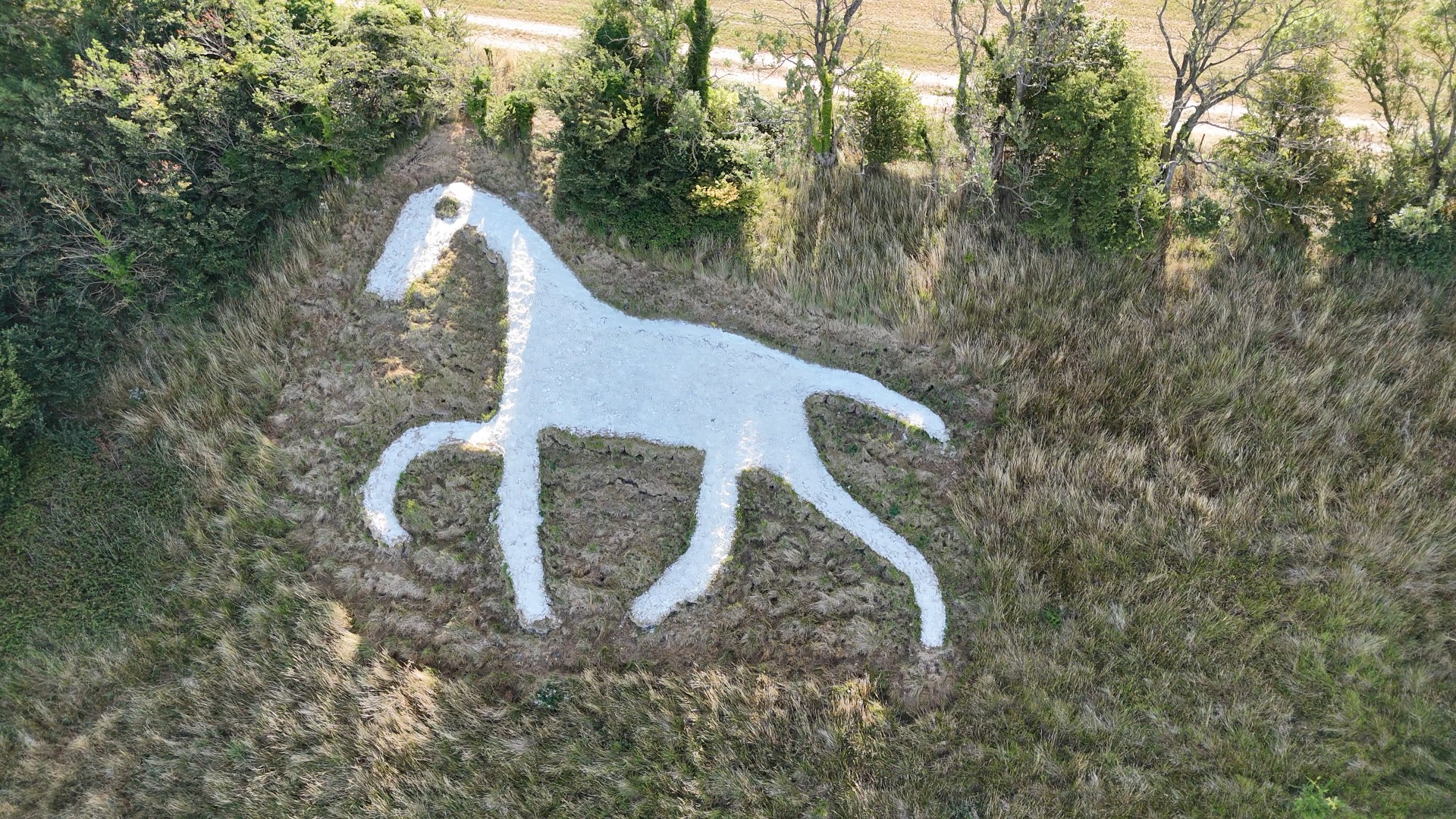
- Broad Town White Horse in 2025

- Location in Wiltshire
- 51°30′12″N 1°51′33″W
- Type: Hill figure monument
- Location: Broad Town, Wiltshire, England

History
- Built: 1864

Site notes
- Material: Chalk
- Height: 18 metres (59 ft)
- Length: 24 metres (79 ft)
- Public access: Yes

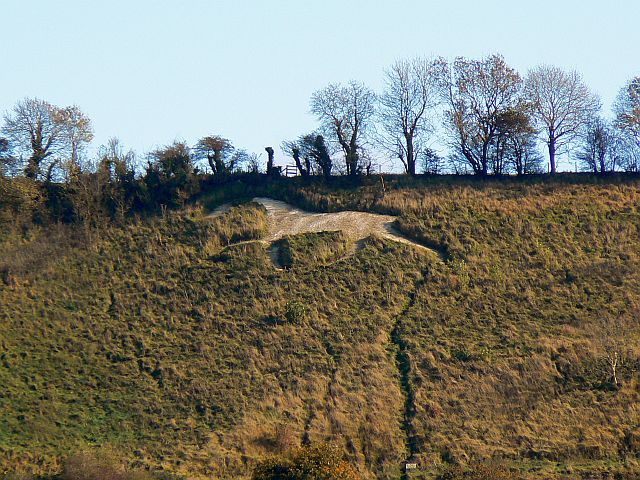
Broad Town White Horse in 2008

Broad Town White Horse is a hill figure of a white horse located in the village of Broad Town, Wiltshire, England. One of eight canonical hill figures in Wiltshire depicting a white horse, it is carved into a 45° slope above Little Town Farmhouse and is visible for 20 miles. The horse is 80 by 60 feet (24 by 18 m) in size and composed of fine compacted chalk with well defined edges. Although its origin is uncertain, according to William Plenderleath, writing in 1885, it was cut in 1864 by a William Simmonds, who held the farm then. Simmonds claimed later that it had been his intention to enlarge the horse gradually over the years, but he had to give up the farm and so did not have the opportunity.

The white horse serves as an icon for the village of Broad Town and is generally regarded as one of the most animated white horse figures in Wiltshire, and has been noted for being both conspicuous, due to its being visible for many miles, and the "secret white horse," due to its rural location away from main roads. The horse regularly fell into neglect over time, and scouring and maintaining the horse was frequently a problem until 1991, when the Broad Town White Horse Restoration Society was formed by local villagers to regularly scour and maintain the horse, which they have continued to do ever since.

== Description and location ==
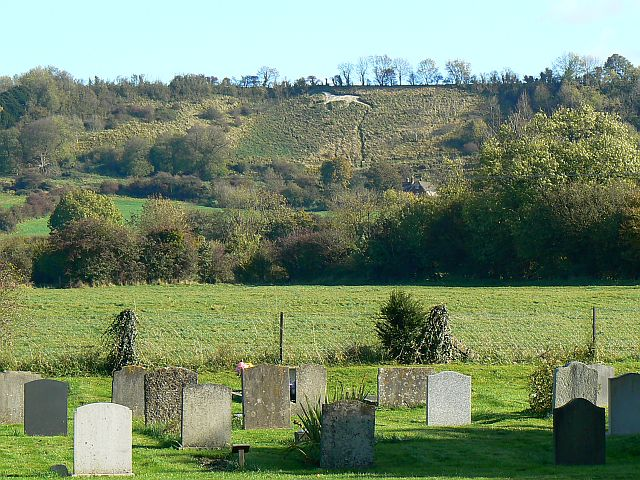
The horse from Broad Town churchyard in 2008

Broad Town White Horse is carved facing west on a long, grass-laden, 45° steep slope (450 metres above mean sea level) above the Little Town Farmhouse that is situated half a mile outside the village of Broad Town. The hill that the horse is cut on used to belong to the farm, and is located on the most western limit of the same escarpment where Uffington White Horse is cut, overlooking the farthest end of the Vale of the White Horse. The horse is 60 feet (18 metres) in height and 80 feet (24 metres) in length, and is "composed of fine compacted chalk." It is the third smallest of the eight canonical white horses in Wiltshire. The horse ties "neck-and-neck" with Hackpen White Horse as the closest white horse to Swindon.

The horse is often considered the most animated of all the white horse figures in Wiltshire, and has been described by writers as a lively, "trotting horse." Although best viewed from the Little Town farm track, the B4041 and the village of Broad Town itself, the horse is visible for some 20 miles, and, being cut onto a 45° slope, it can be seen "to fine effect" from the Great Western Railway line through Swindon. Writer Paul Newman describes the horse as a "conspicuous landmark," although some consider the horse obscure, with one writer referring to it as "the secret white horse, difficult to find and even harder to see." Barry Leighton of the Swindon Advertiser similarly claimed: "Broad Town could have laid a decent claim to being the most enigmatic of our magnificent mares – largely because you had to be quick just to catch a glimpse of her – flitting in and out as she does from behind bushes and trees along the Wootton Bassett to Marlborough B40[4]1."

Visiting Broad Town White Horse can be problematic for visitors. One writer claims that, as there are no designated parking spaces for the horse, it is best for tourists to park their vehicles in the village and walk to the horse from there. A footpath from the farmhouse leading up to the white horse features dangerous steps, and the Broad Town White Horse Restoration Society asks visitors not to use them. The society only use the steps for maintenance of the horse, and, being private land, cannot accept responsibility for accidents. It is also possible to reach the horse using footpaths on top of the hill; however, parking becomes once again a problem when using this route.

== Origins ==
The origin of Broad Town White Horse is uncertain, although there are multiple stories concerning its origin. The most common story, originating from Reverend Plenderleath, writing in 1885, is that the horse was cut in 1864 by William Simmonds, who at the time owned the land and Littletown Farm, whose land the horse was a part of. According to this story, the horse originally measured 86 feet long and 61 feet tall, but this size were not intended to be the horse's final proportions, as Simmonds had intended "to enlarge it by the degrees" each time he scoured the horse, so that each time he scoured and maintained the horse, the horse's size would grow until it "assumed a really impressive aspect." He intended to do this by increasing the size of the horse's outline, and according to writer Esther Smith, author of White Horses of Wiltshire & Uffington, "this would not have been a very effective way of enlarging the horse; the neck for example could not be made longer without moving the head." However, Simmonds ultimately did not keep the farm land long enough for him to see the horse's size grow to a particularly different size. "We have been spared the sight of a very distorted figure with a short neck and thick legs," Smith wrote.

However, in 1919, the Curator of the Imperial War Museum claimed in a local newspaper that he visited the horse as a schoolboy in 1863, when he and a friend spent four or five hours on the hill scouring the horse, adding that an elderly relative told him that the horse had been on the hill for at least fifty years. It is possible he confused Broad Town horse with another horse, but if his account is accurate, then Simmonds would "merely have been a renovator rather than an innovator." A more vague story of the horse's origin is that it was cut in 1896 by a Mr Hussey, Horsey or Horsley, although Smith concedes that this was actually a case of recutting the horse after a period of neglect. According to another account, the horse's design "suggests greater antiquity" than 1864, while also suggesting that it could have been carved in 1865 to celebrate the birth of Prince George (later George V), given as how "church bells were rung across the country and salutes fired in 1865."

== History and maintenance ==
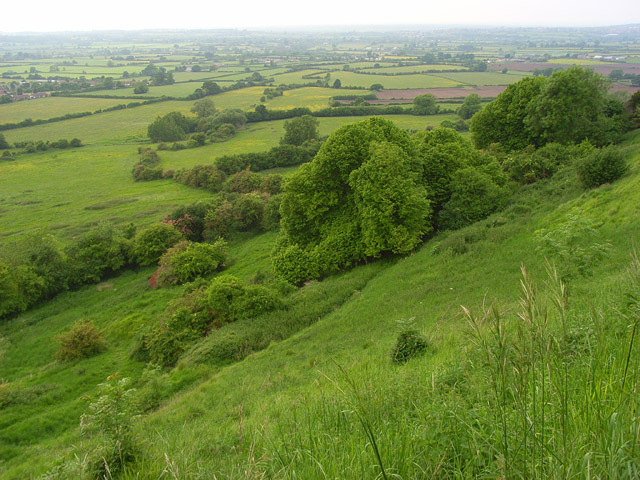
The view from the white horse.

During World War II, the horse was successfully camouflaged to avoid the attention of the German air force; this was achieved with hedge trimmings that were covered with turf and soil. When the horse was uncovered in 1945, its condition was not good, and throughout the horse's life, the horse was known to become so overgrown that it was almost invisible, and indeed, a 1980s book on Wiltshire's white horses had described the horse as "now invisible." Following a Village Appraisal in early 1991, over 90% of Broad Town's inhabitants showed a readiness to support the restoration and cleaning of the white horse. As a result, The Broad Town White Horse Restoration Society was formed, and using money given to the society by community grants and funds raised by inhabitants of the village, the village placed over 180 tons of chalk onto the horse which was then limed, restoring the horse to "perky and playful good sorts." Due to the steepness of the hill, metal stakes were installed to keep the chalk in place. The restoration of the horse attracted wide local coverage from both the press and television.

The society, formed of several local villagers, continue to regularly restore and scour the horse, and in the words of Dr Mark Hows, "intends to make sure that the Horse will be well maintained so that it will remain a well known local landmark." The horse is trimmed and weeded twice a year to ensure that the outline and shape of the figure is retained. A recent scouring of the horse took place on 14 and 15 June 2014, led by Bob Clarke, a local archaeologist. The scouring included over a tonne of powdered lime used to restore the horse's white appearance; rainfall turns the lime powder into a hard crust which "gives the horse another year of life."

== Iconography ==
The horse serves as an icon for the village, and Leighton has described the horse as having served "for more than a century as a dazzling emblem or logo for the village below." The horse appears in the logo for the village's primary school, and was stitched into an altar cloth for the school. In 2015, wildlife artist Joanna May donated her painting of a hare besides the white horse to a Devizes charity auction; she said "Wiltshire is loved for being the area of the White Horse and also for the hare being synonymous with it." The white horse is part of several tours, including the 90-mile walking tour 'Wiltshire's White Horse Trail', better known as simply the White Horse Trail, which visits all eight of the canonical white horses in Wiltshire. The tour was established in 2000 by the Wiltshire Tourism board.

== See also ==
- Hill figure
- List of hill figures in Wiltshire
- Broad Town

Wiltshire white horses

- Alton Barnes white horse
- Cherhill White Horse
- Devizes White Horse
- Hackpen White Horse
- Marlborough White Horse
- Pewsey White Horse
- Westbury White Horse
- Litlington White Horse
