= Osmington White Horse =

Hill figure near Osmington, Dorset, England

Coordinates: 50.65741°N 2.40438°W

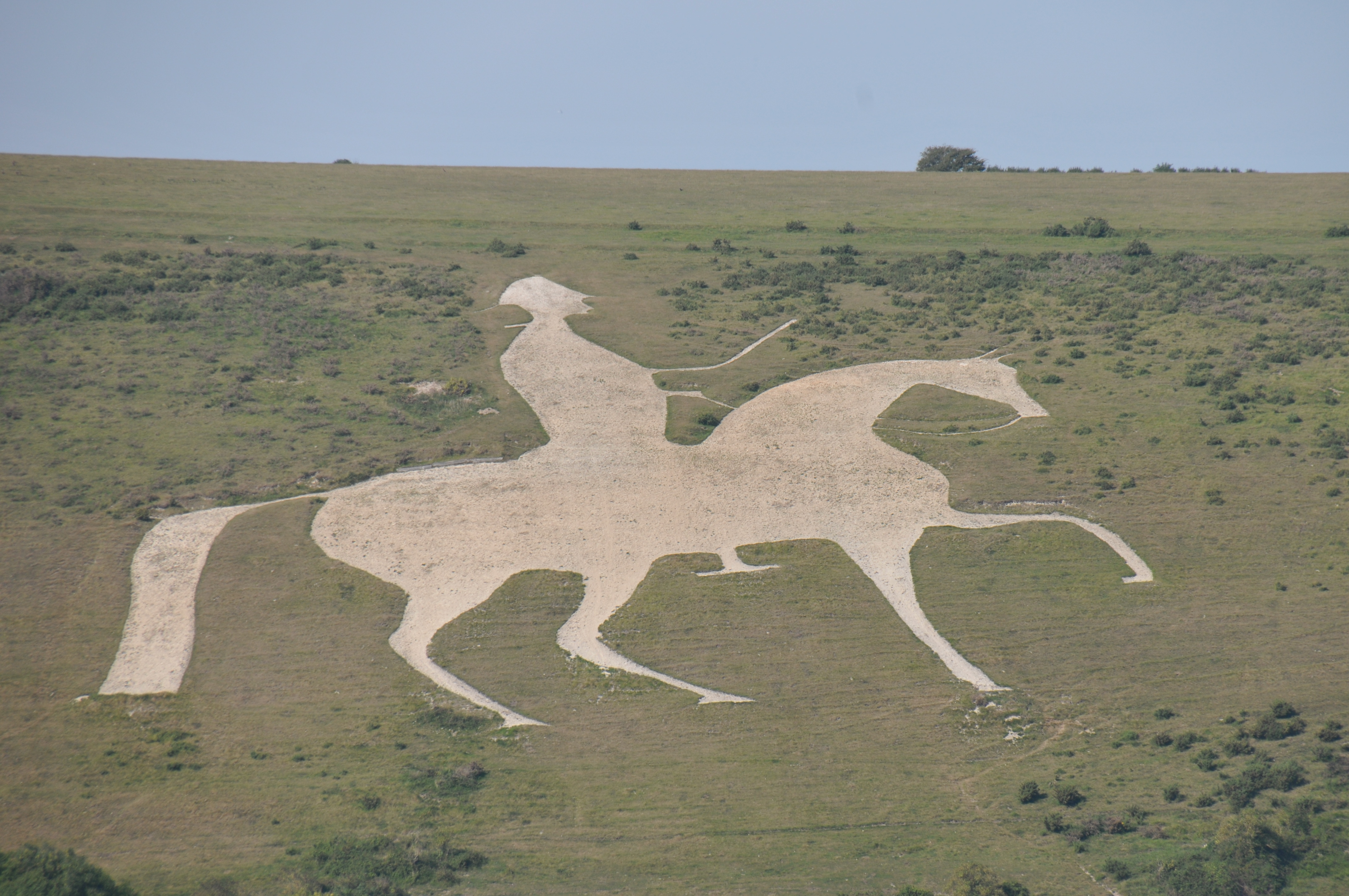
The Osmington White Horse in 2013

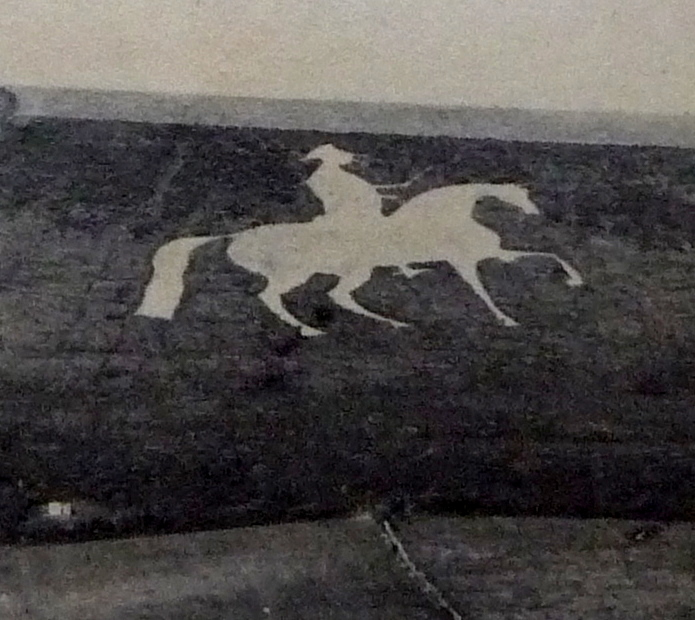
The Osmington White Horse in 1883

The Osmington White Horse is a hill figure cut into the limestone of Osmington Hill just north of Weymouth in Dorset in 1808. It is in the South Dorset Downs in the parish of Osmington.

The figure depicts King George III riding his horse and can be seen for miles around. The king was a regular visitor to Weymouth and made it 'the first resort'. The figure is 280 feet (85 m) long and 323 feet (98 m) high and is best viewed from the A353 road.

In 1989 the figure was restored for a broadcast of the TV show Challenge Anneka, although the work was subsequently criticised by historians for doing more harm than good. Anneka Rice, presenter of the show, stated that planning permission and advice had been sought before the work.

In August 2011 pranksters added a 'horn' made from plastic sheeting to make the horse resemble a unicorn.

In 2012, it was announced that for the Olympics 2012, the horse would be cleaned and slightly recut to make it look like the original when it was cut in 1808. Restoration was completed on 11 March 2012, and Princess Anne attended a ceremony at which a new plaque made of local stone was revealed. The restoration was done by volunteers, who spent two years carrying out repairs.

The figure is designated as a Scheduled Monument.

== See also ==
- Chalk figures in the United Kingdom
- Cherhill White Horse
- Litlington White Horse
- Mormond Hill White Horse
- Westbury White Horse

== Bibliography ==
- Plenderleath, Rev. W. C., The White Horses of the West of England (London: Allen & Storr, 1892).
