= Broad Town =

Village in Wiltshire, England

Coordinates: 51.499°N 1.870°W

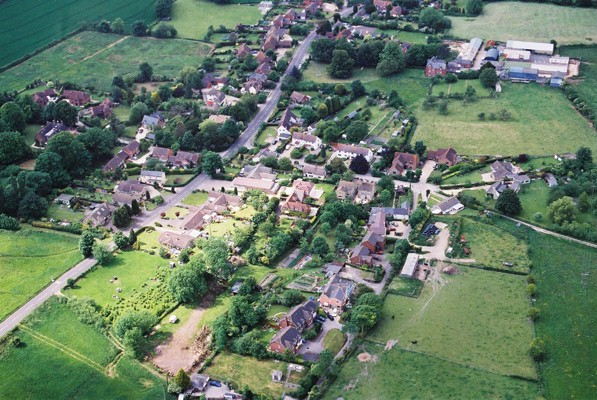
- Broad Town from the air in 2006

- Location within Wiltshire
- Population: 588 (in 2021)
- OS grid reference: SU091778
- Civil parish: Broad Town
- Unitary authority: Wiltshire
- Ceremonial county: Wiltshire
- Region: South West
- Country: England
- Sovereign state: United Kingdom
- Post town: Swindon
- Postcode district: SN4
- Dialling code: 01793
- Police: Wiltshire
- Fire: Dorset and Wiltshire
- Ambulance: South Western
- UK Parliament: Chippenham
- Website: Parish Council

Broad Town is a village and civil parish in Wiltshire, England, about 3 miles (5 km) southeast of Royal Wootton Bassett and 6 miles (10 km) southwest of Swindon. The parish includes the hamlet of Thornhill and the farming hamlet of Cotmarsh. The parish population at the 2021 census was 588.

The parish is the site of a chalk horse, believed to have been cut in 1864 and known as the Broad Town White Horse.

== Archaeology ==
From 1996, the village and surrounding landscape were the subject of an archaeological project supported by the University of Bath, Swindon College and QinetiQ Archaeology.

== Local government ==
The civil parish elects a parish council. It is in the area of Wiltshire Council unitary authority, which performs most significant local government functions.

The civil parish of Broad Town was created in 1884 by combining parts of Clyffe Pypard and Broad Hinton parishes. Until then, Broad Town and Thornhill were tithings of Clyffe Pypard.

== Parish church ==
The parish church, Christ Church was built in 1844–1845 with funding from the Marchioness of Ailesbury (who later provided the estate church, St Katherine's, at Tottenham House) and from the local Goddard family. Until the church was built, Broad Town was a tithing of Clyffe Pypard; the area served by the new church comprised parts of the ecclesiastical parishes of Clyffe Pypard and Broad Hinton.

== Amenities ==
The local school, now Broad Town CofE (VC) Primary School, was built near the church in 1859 and expanded in 1892. More classrooms were added in the 20th and early 21st centuries.

The parish has village hall that is used by a social club.

There is an annual Broad Town Village Show, which since 2006 has taken the form of the "Broad Town Big Gig". This event is held at Manor Farm and features both local and national bands playing on a Saturday evening in September.

== Notable residents ==
- Nikolaus Pevsner (1902–1983), architectural historian, lived within the parish.
- Geoffrey Grigson (1905–1985), poet and critic, lived at Broad Town Farmhouse from 1945 to 1985.
- Jane Grigson (1928–1990), food writer.
- Lionel Grigson (1942–1994), jazz musician and educator, lived for part of his childhood at Broad Town.
- Sophie Grigson (b. 1959), food writer, spent her childhood at Broad Town.
