= Tan Hill, Wiltshire =

Hill in England

Coordinates: 51.3812°N 1.8837°W

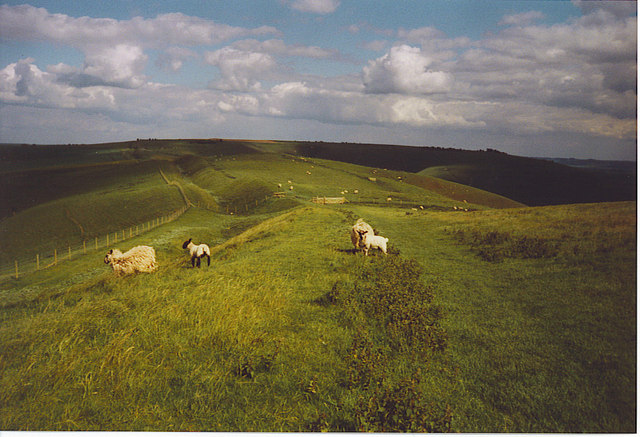
The Wansdyke on Tan Hill

Tan Hill (grid reference SU081646) is a hill north of Allington in the parish of All Cannings, Wiltshire, England.

Its summit is 294 metres (965 ft) above sea level and is the second highest point of the North Wessex Downs AONB hill range (the adjacent Milk Hill is 295 m high), and of Wiltshire. It is also the third highest point between Bristol and London. On 23 August 2009, the BBC programme Countryfile featured an item on analysis by Ordnance Survey to determine whether Milk or Tan Hill is the highest. It was confirmed that Milk Hill is 26 centimetres (10.2 in) higher than Tan Hill.

Along the north side of Tan Hill runs a section of The Wansdyke, an earthen rampart which runs east to west across much of southern England.

The hill is frequently used by the Thames Valley Hang Gliding and Paragliding Club in conjunction with Milk Hill.

== Hill figure and stone circle ==
Formerly, Tan Hill had a hill figure of a white horse, sometimes called the Tan Hill Donkey because of its notably large head. Author Kathleen Wiltshire, in her book Wiltshire Folklore, published in 1975, described the figure being still partly visible "on Tan Hill, though the legs have become quite overgrown... This pony or donkey is 75 feet from nose to tail, which stretches down much like that of the Uffington horse, and its head is very large." She went on to write that in "the 'valley' between Tan Hill and Rybury Camp stands a miniature stone circle of nine upright sarsen stones about four feet in height, in the centre of which lies a prostrate stone, about the length of a man. A pathway leads up to the 'donkey' from the circle." The figure subsequently became known as Mrs Wiltshire's Donkey. Whilst Wiltshire placed the hill figure on Tan Hill, another later source described it on a "medium steep slope between Tan Hill and Ryebury Camp".

The white horse was described as "overgrown" in 1964, with its legs having disappeared. In March 2002, local research by wiltshirewhitehorses.org.uk confirmed the horse's existence and established the location of the stone circle, whose position had been misleadingly described in Wiltshire's book. The stone circle had been previously noted during an archaeological field investigation in 1973, but was thought likely to be a modern arrangement of field clearance boulders rather than a prehistoric monument. The path to the horse from the circle still existed in 2002, but no trace of the horse remained. However, in November 2004, vegetation and light conditions allowed the horse's shape to be discerned.

In folklore, it was said locally that when the horse heard All Cannings' church clock strike midnight it went down to a dewpond above Cannings Cross to drink. One night it was supposedly so thirsty that it drank the pond dry, even though a dewpond is said never to dry up.

== Views ==
Views are extensive from Tan Hill, ranging from Cheesefoot Head near Winchester to the southeast to, in clear weather, the Black Mountains in Wales to the northwest, making this, alongside neighbouring Milk Hill, one of the most southeasterly points in the UK from which high mountain country can be sighted. Salisbury Plain and, further away, the Mendips and Cotswolds are also clearly visible.

According to computer-generated panoramas it should be possible to sight Pen y Fan, highest point of the Brecon Beacons, in exceptionally clear weather.
