= Milk Hill =

Hill in Wiltshire, England

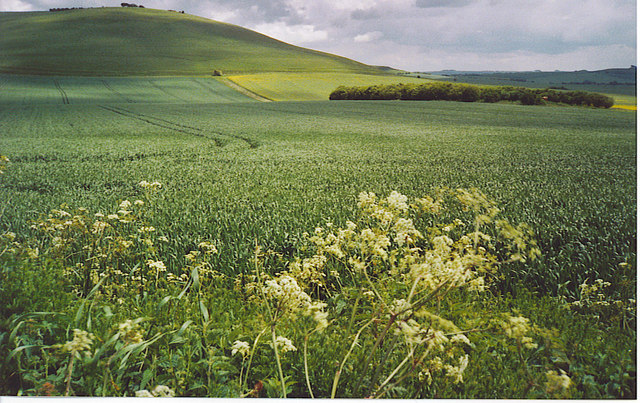
- Milk Hill

Highest point
- Elevation: 295 m (968 ft)
- Prominence: 148 m (486 ft)
- Listing: Hardy, County top
- Coordinates: 51°22′40″N 1°51′07″W

Geography
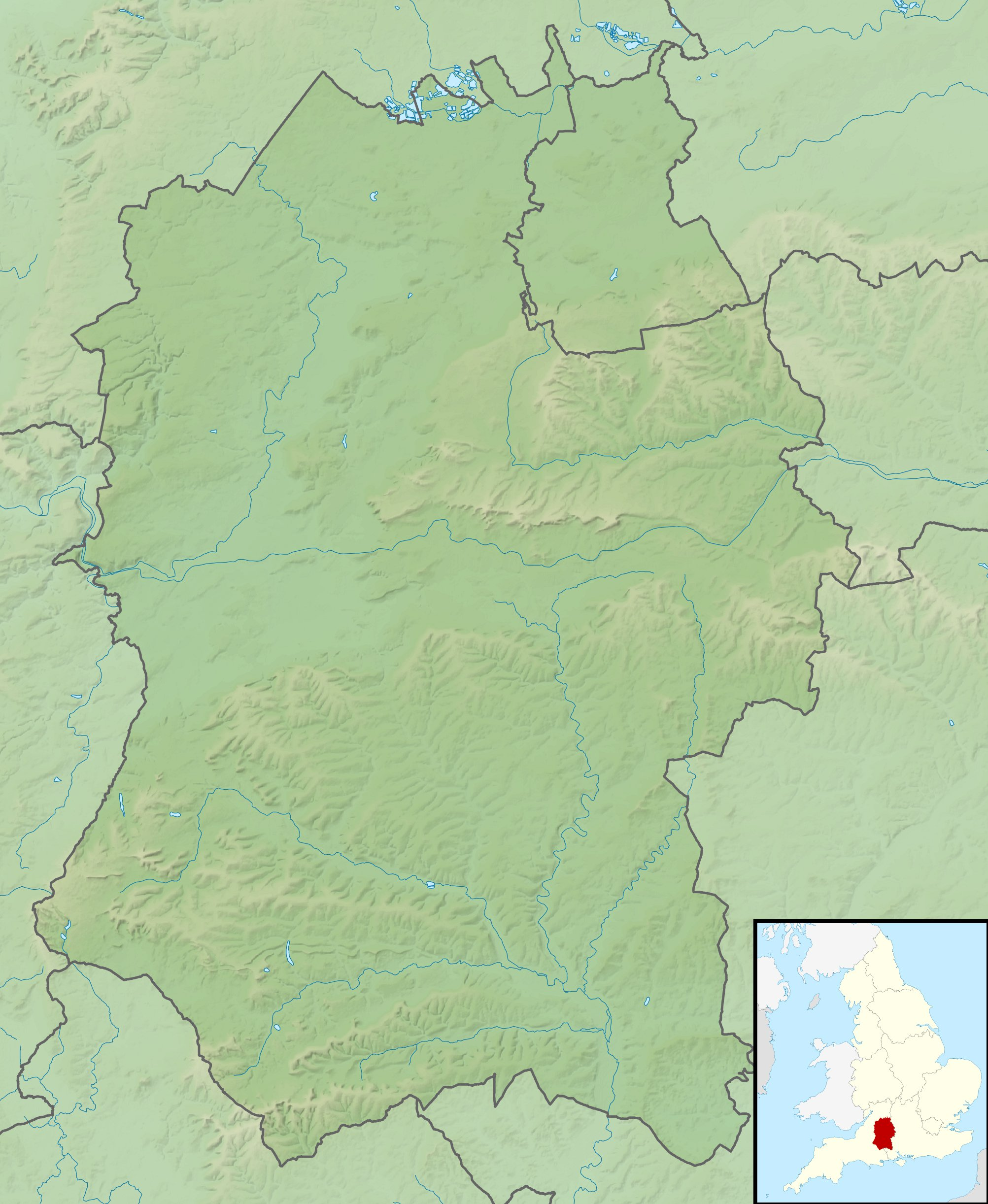
- Location within Wiltshire
- Location: Wiltshire, England
- Parent range: North Wessex Downs
- OS grid: SU104643
- Topo map: OS Landranger 165

Milk Hill, located near Alton Priors east of Devizes, is the highest point in the county of Wiltshire, southwest England, at some 295 m (968 ft) above sea level (the adjacent Tan Hill rises to 294 m). It is the location of the Alton Barnes White Horse (a hill figure cut in 1812).

== Height ==
On 23 August 2009, the BBC programme Countryfile featured an item on analysis by Ordnance Survey to determine whether Milk or Tan Hill is the higher. It was confirmed that Milk Hill is 26 centimetres (10.2 in) higher than Tan Hill.

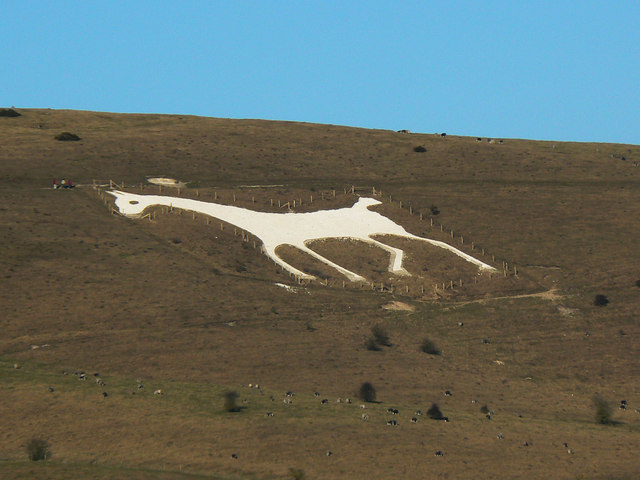
Alton Barnes White Horse

Located at the western edge of the Vale of Pewsey (part of the North Wessex Downs AONB), it is also the highest summit along a 50 km ridge extending all the way from the South Downs, across the southern Chilterns and into Wiltshire. Milk Hill is the second highest point between Bristol and London after Walbury Hill in West Berkshire (297 m; 974 ft), and is thus also the second highest chalk hill in the UK, again behind Walbury Hill, though it has a slightly greater prominence.

Views are extensive from here, as far as the Mendips and Cotswolds and in very clear weather as far as the Black Mountains in South Wales, making this one of the most southeasterly points in the UK from which high mountain country can be sighted.

== Hang gliding/paragliding ==
Milk Hill is frequently used by the Thames Valley Hang Gliding and Paragliding Club.

- It was the starting point for longest hang-glider flight ever in the UK on 10 May 2011 by Nev Almond. He flew 269 km (167 mi) to near Blakeney on the Norfolk coast.
- It was also the starting point for the longest paraglider flight in the UK, by Mark Watts on 3 August 2014: 275.5 km (171.2 mi), to near Felbrigg in Norfolk.
- Alex Coltman (M) broke the record achieved by Mark Watts in 2017 with a new 281 km (175 mi) paraglider flight straight-line record to Mundesley in Norfolk.
- Kirsty Cameron (F) also broke paragliding records in 2017 with a straight-line 235.6 km (146.4 mi) flight from Alton Barnes White Horse to near Beeston in Norfolk. She also gained a declared goal record with Luke Nicol and Mark Watts.

Milk Hill continues to be one of the best locations in England for free flight.

== Gallery ==
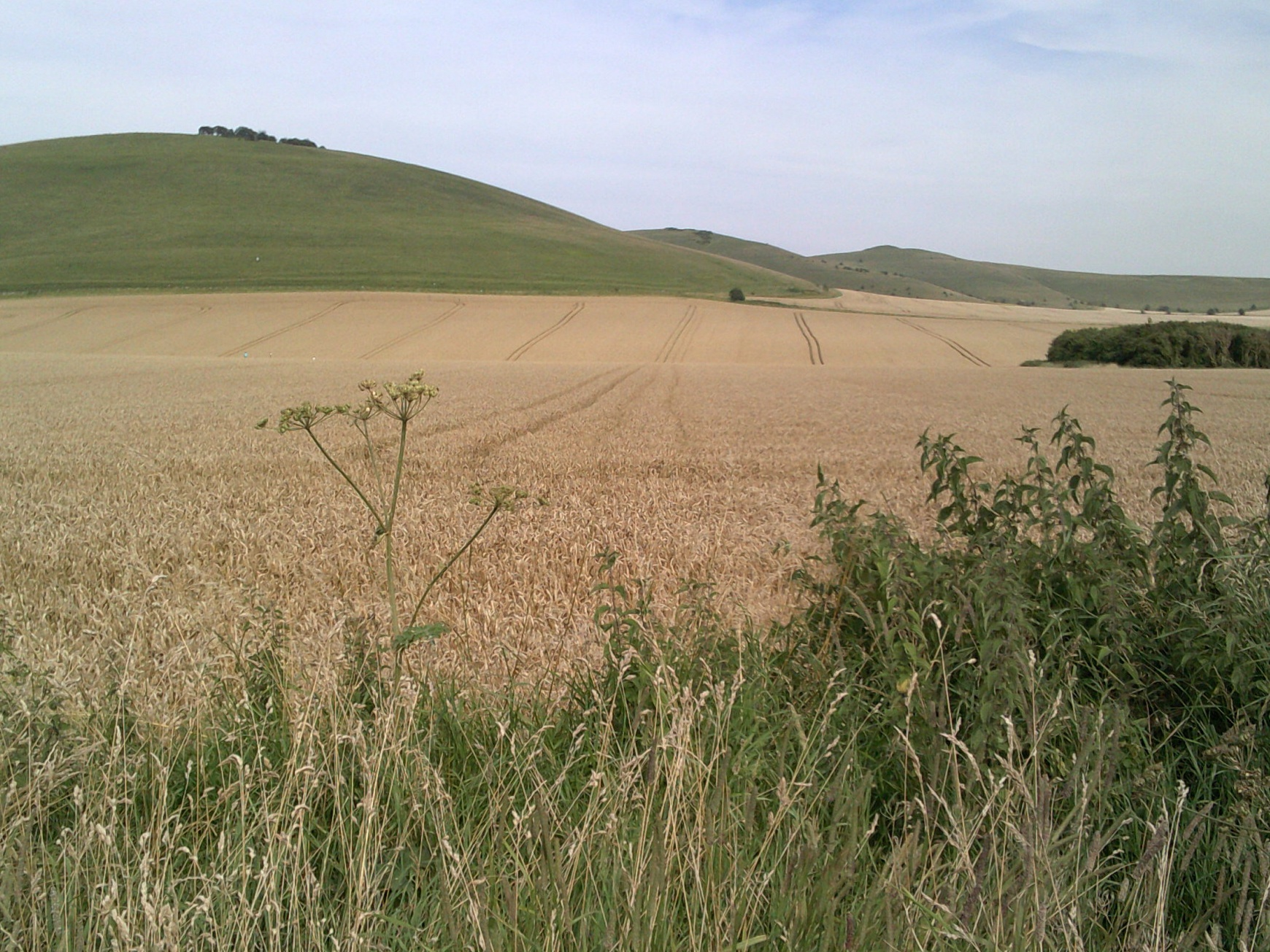
Milk Hill and Walkers Hill

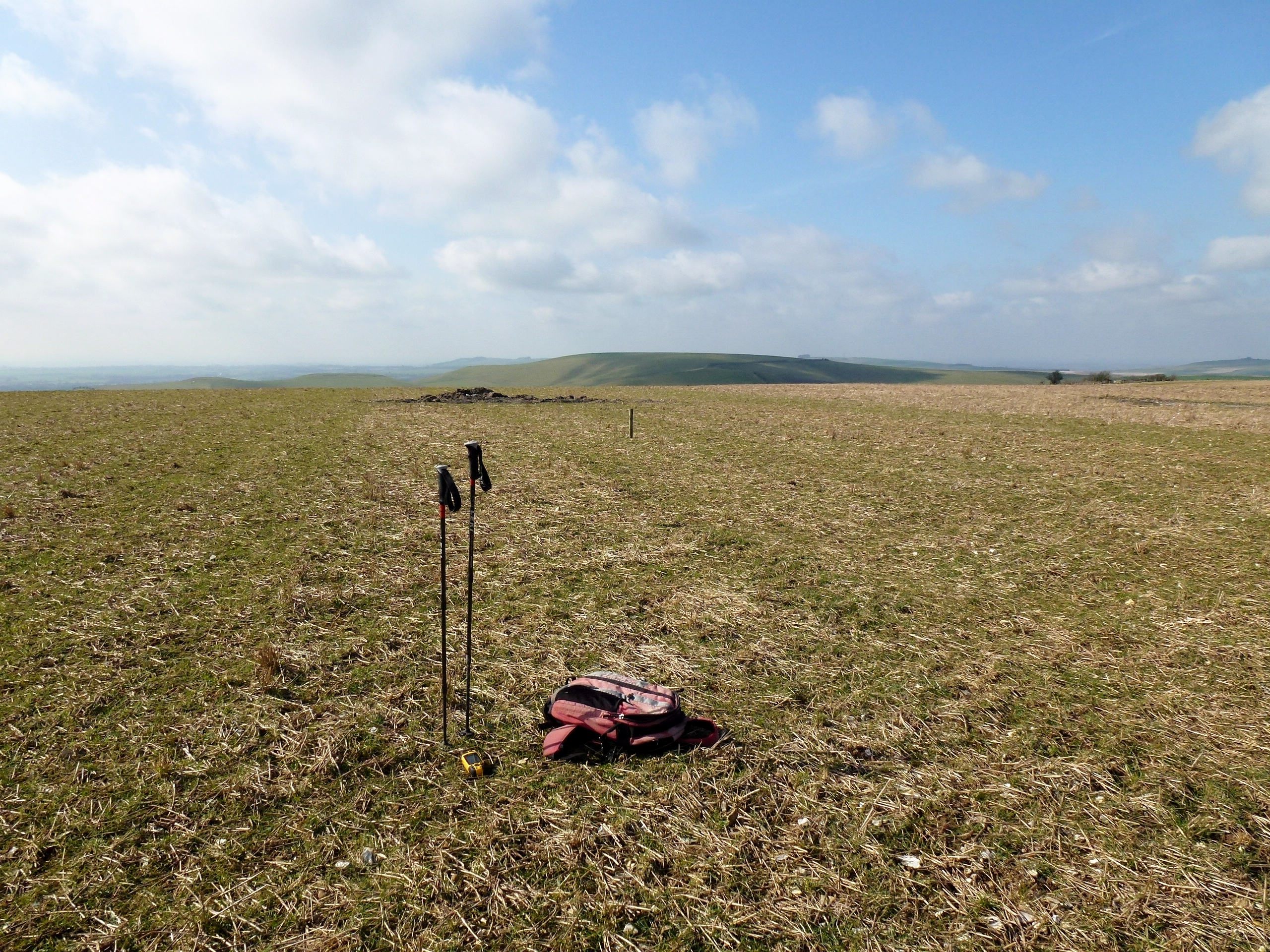
On Milk Hill in 2012

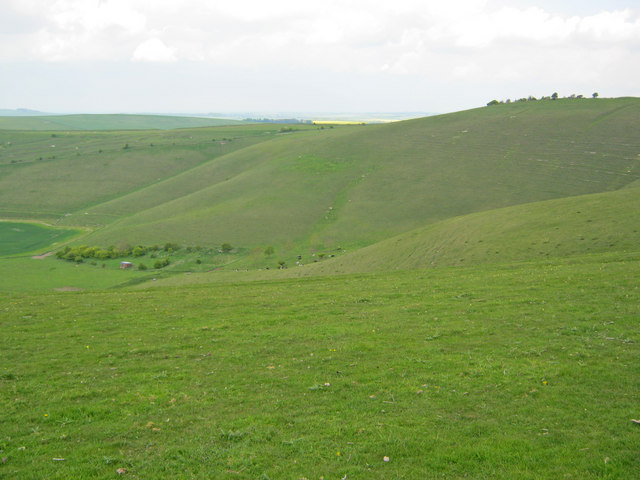
Downland on Milk Hill

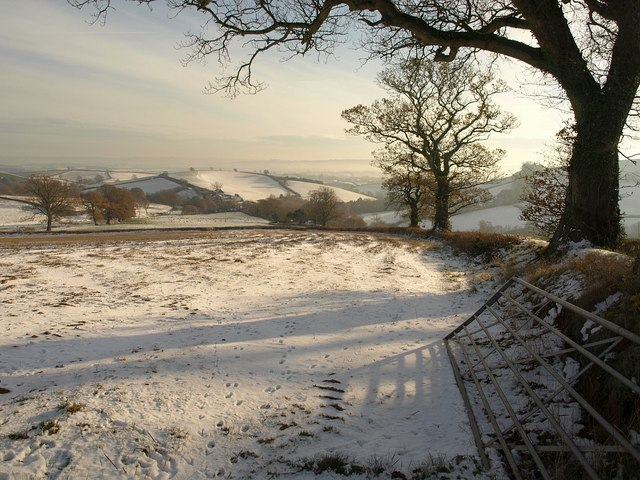
Scene in December 2010

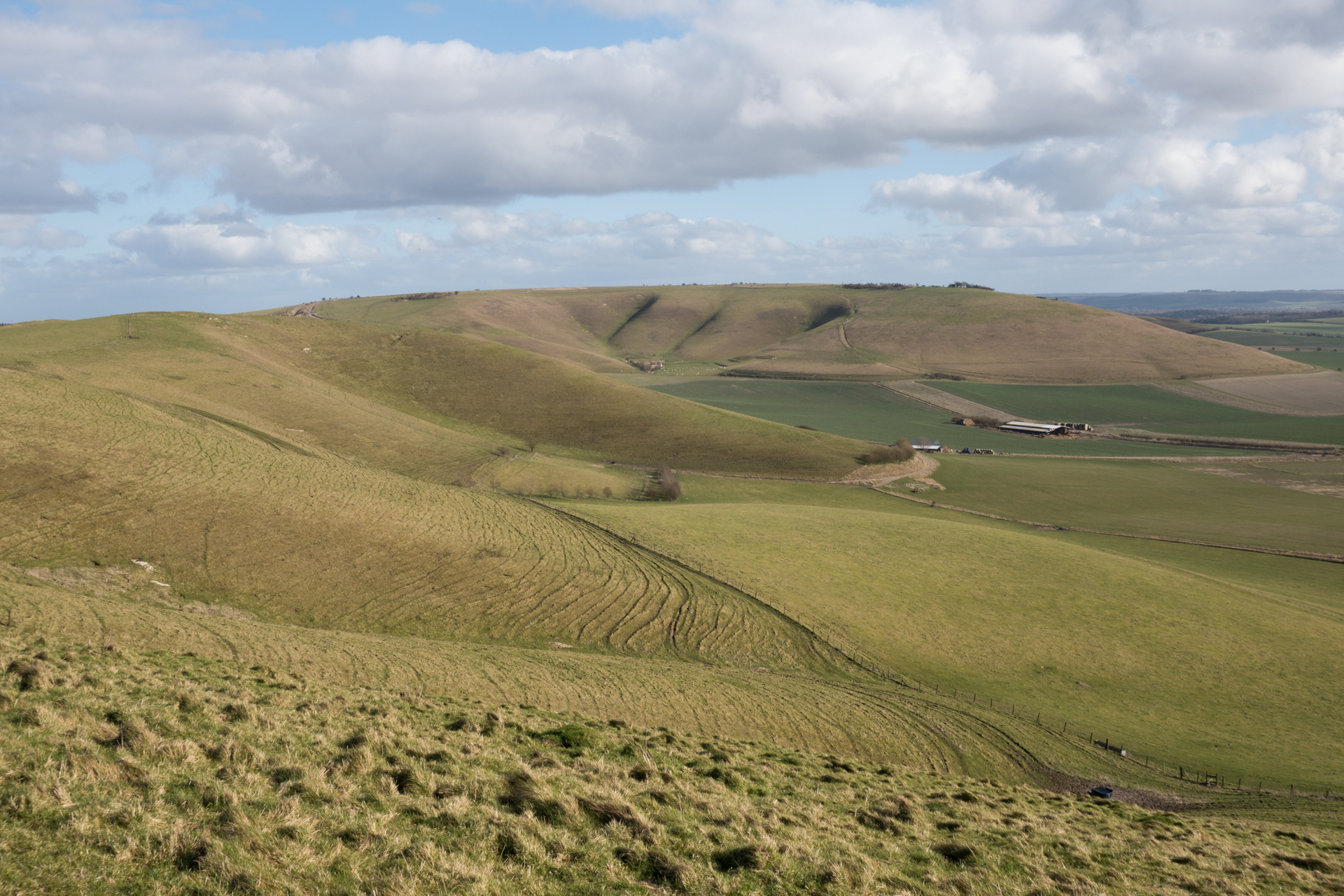
View towards Milk Hill (from All Cannings)

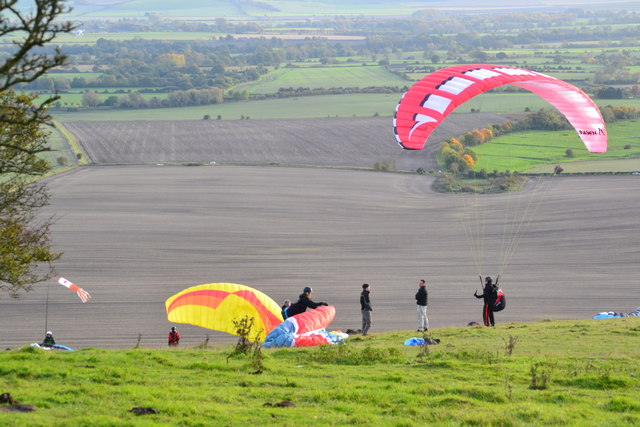
Hang gliders on Milk Hill
