= William Plenderleath =

British priest (1831–1906)

William Charles Plenderleath
- Rector of Cherhill and Mamhead
- Church: Church of England
- In office: 1860–1891 (Cherhill); 1891–1905 (Mamhead)

Personal details
- Born: 2 June 1831 Clifton, Bristol, England
- Died: April 1, 1906 (aged 74) England
- Denomination: Anglican
- Children: Margaret Edith Plenderleath, Maud Mary Le Fevre Plenderleath
- Occupation: Clergyman, author, antiquarian
- Education: Cheltenham College
- Alma mater: Wadham College, Oxford

William Charles Plenderleath (2 June 1831 – 1 April 1906) was an English Anglican clergyman, author and antiquarian, best remembered for his White Horses of the West of England (1885, 2nd edition 1892).

== Life ==
Uffington White Horse, sketched by William Plenderleath in The White Horses of the West of England (1892)

Born at Clifton, Bristol, Plenderleath was the only son of Lieutenant Colonel Charles Plenderleath, of 27, Richmond Terrace, Clifton. Colonel Plenderleath was a half-pay officer of the 49th Regiment of Foot. He had been commissioned into the 89th Regiment of Foot on 29 May 1796, served in the War of 1812, was decorated after the Battle of Crysler's Farm of 1813, and was a Companion of the Order of the Bath (CB).

Plenderleath was educated at Cheltenham College in Gloucestershire and at Wadham College, Oxford, graduating BA and MA, and entered the ministry of the Church of England. He was Rector of Cherhill, Wiltshire, from December 1860 to April 1891, and then of Mamhead in Devon from 1891 until 1905, dying on 1 April 1906.

While he was at Cherhill, Plenderleath's interest in the Cherhill White Horse led him to write a paper, On the White Horses of Wiltshire and Its Neighbourhood (1872) for the Wiltshire Archaeological Magazine, followed some years later by a book, White Horses of the West of England (1885). He also kept a notebook of Cherhill's affairs which was first published in 2001, ninety-five years after the author's death, as Plenderleath's Memoranda of Cherhill. He intended this as a record of "what an English country village was in the 19th century, as portrayed by one who had the best opportunities of knowing".

At Mamhead, from 1891, Plenderleath also kept notes of his parish, described as "Includes census details (official and unofficial), offertory accounts, list of communions, collections in aid of voluntary church rate, and confirmations. In the front is a linen-backed map showing inhabited houses in Mamhead".

== Publications ==
Plenderleath's sketch of the Cherhill White Horse, 1892

- 'On the White Horses of Wiltshire and Its Neighbourhood', in Wilts Archaeological Magazine, vol. 14 for 1872, pp. 12–30
- White Horses of the West of England (London: Alfred Russell Smith; & Calne: Alfred Heath, 1885)
- White Horses of the West of England (London: Allen & Storr, 2nd edition, 1892)
- Plenderleath's Memoranda of Cherhill, ed. John Reis (Compton Bassett: Fulmer Publishing, for the Village & Family History Project, 2001, xxxviii + 134 pp., ISBN 1-903979-05-6)

== Family ==
The 1881 census for The Rectory, Cherhill, gives a snapshot of Plenderleath's household. His wife, Margaret E.J. [Plenderleath], was aged forty-four and had been born in the West Indies. Margaret Edith Plenderleath (unmarried, age 24, born Bedminster, Gloucestershire), and Maud Mary Plenderleath (unmarried aged 2?, born Clifton, Gloucestershire) were their daughters. Five domestic servants are also recorded, a cook, a footman, a lady's maid, and two housemaids.

On 20 April 1881, at Cherhill, Plenderleath's daughter Maud Mary Le Fevre Plenderleath married George Bayntun Starky (1858–1926) of Spye Park House, Bromham, Wiltshire, later of Brackenfield Station, Amberley, New Zealand, and they had six sons:

1. John Bayntun (1882–1944);
2. George (1883–1959), who served as an officer in the Wiltshire Regiment and became a farmer in New Zealand;
3. Wadham (1883–1953), a member of the New Zealand Expeditionary Force, also a farmer in New Zealand;
4. Francis (died 1963), a farmer at Toatoa, near Ōpōtiki, New Zealand;
5. Walter (1886–1930), an officer in the Somerset Yeomanry who became a sheep farmer in Argentina;
6. James (1889–1916), who was killed in action during World War I while serving in the Wiltshire Regiment.

A stained glass window at St James's church, Cherhill, bears the inscription:

A. M. D. G. and in memory of Wm Chas Plenderleath, Priest, 1831 – 1906; Margaret, his wife, 1836 – 1913, and Edith their daughter, 1857 – 1926. R. I. P.
