= Cherhill White Horse =

English hill figure

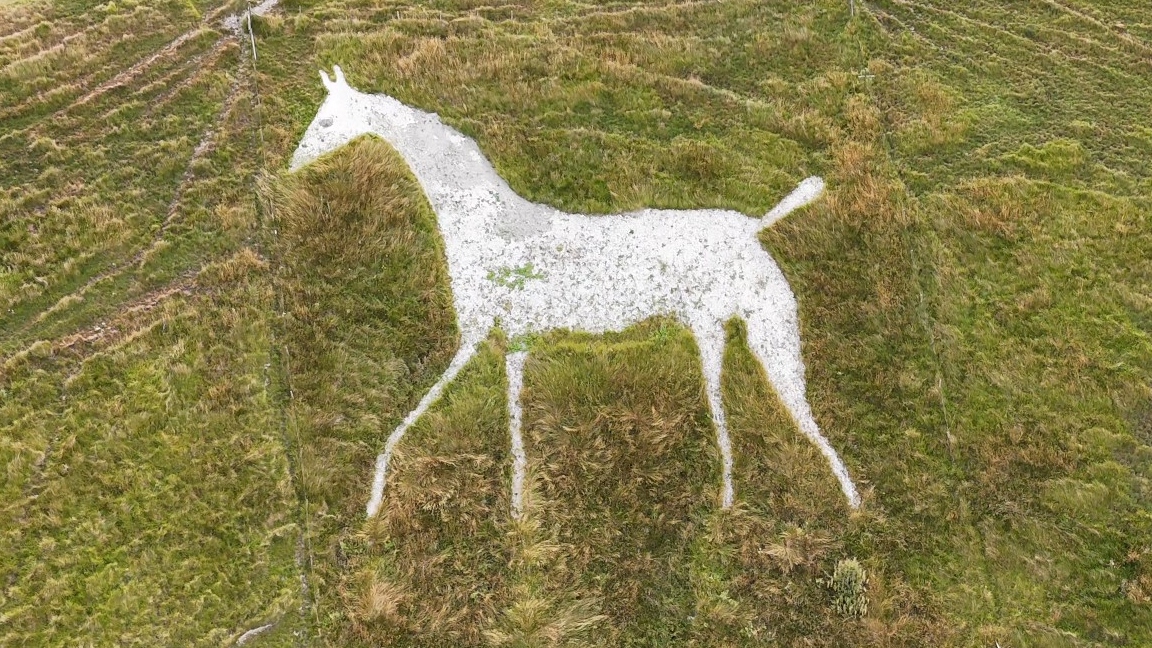
- Cherhill White Horse in 2025

- Location in Wiltshire
- 51.42518°N 1.92977°W
- Type: Hill figure monument
- Location: Cherhill Down, Wiltshire, England

History
- Built: 1780

Site notes
- Material: Chalk
- Height: 37 metres (121 ft)
- Length: 50 metres (160 ft)
- Public access: Yes

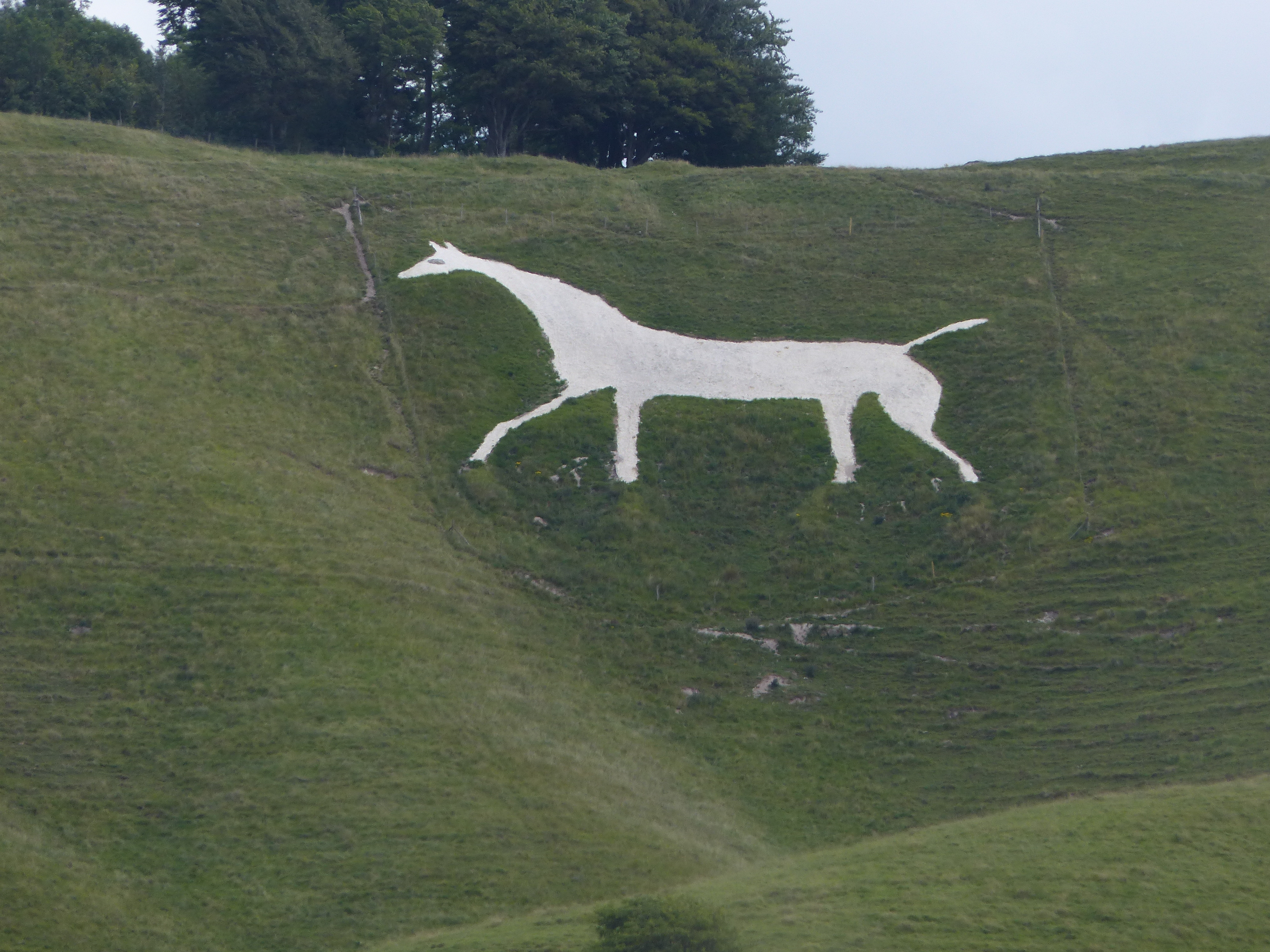
Cherhill White Horse in 2015

Cherhill White Horse is a hill figure on Cherhill Down in Wiltshire, England, just outside the village of Cherhill and about 3.5 miles (5.6 km) east of Calne. Dating from the late 18th century, it is much younger than the Neolithic white horses. The figure is also sometimes known as the Oldbury White Horse.

== Location ==
Facing north-east, the figure lies on a steep slope of Cherhill Down, a little below the earthwork known as Oldbury Castle. It is visible from the A4 road and from the nearby village of Cherhill. A viewpoint is provided by a lay-by on the westbound carriageway of the A4, from which a public footpath ascends towards the figure.

Approximately 330 metres from the horse stands the Lansdowne Monument, an obelisk often visible in photographs of the site.

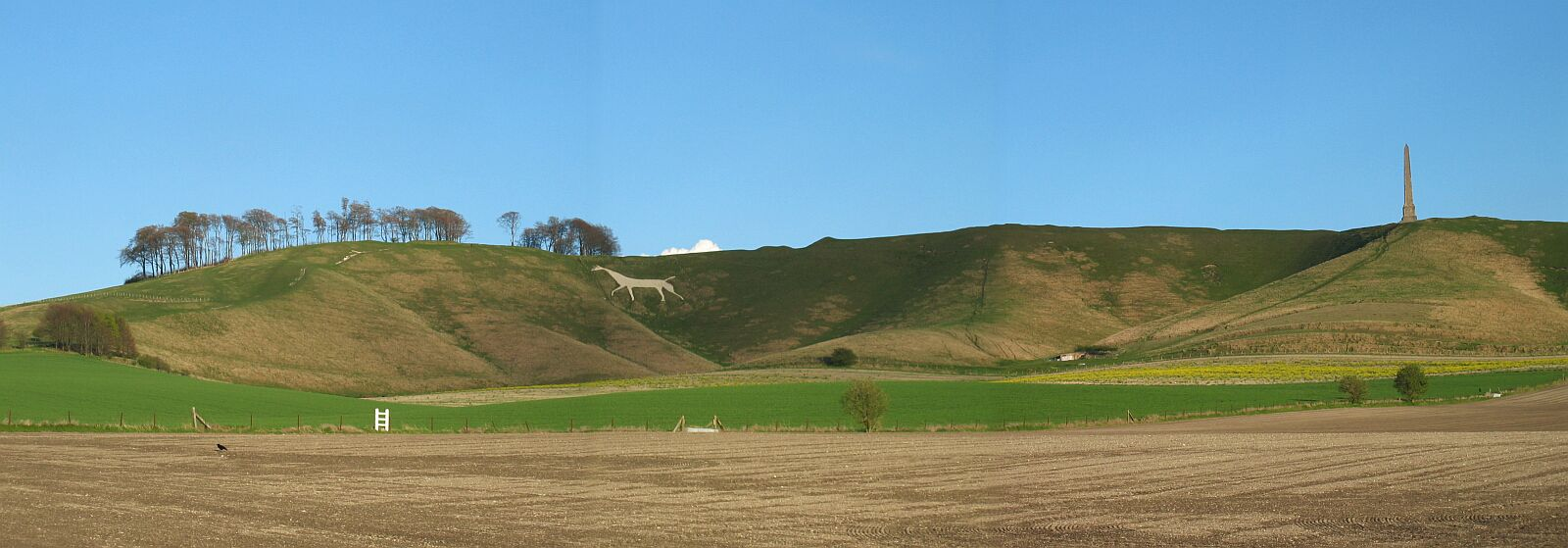
Cherhill White Horse with the Lansdowne Monument

== Inspiration ==
The Cherhill horse may have been inspired by the earlier Westbury White Horse in Wiltshire, which had recently been remodelled. The origins of the Westbury figure are uncertain; the earliest documentary reference appears in a paper by the Rev. Francis Wise in 1742.

Several theories have been proposed for the origin of the Wiltshire white horses. One suggests that they commemorate Alfred the Great's victory over Guthrum at the Battle of Ethandun in 878. Another proposes that they were created in the early 18th century as expressions of loyalty to the House of Hanover, whose heraldic emblem was the white horse. As one commentator has noted, the origins of many such figures remain uncertain.

== History ==
The horse in 1892, illustrated by the Rev. W. C. Plenderleath

The figure was first cut in 1780 by Dr Christopher Alsop of Calne, who created it by removing turf to expose the underlying chalk. Its original dimensions were approximately 165 feet (50 m) by 220 feet (67 m). Alsop, who served as Guild Steward of the Borough of Calne, has been described as "the mad doctor" and is said to have directed the work from a distance using a megaphone. The design may have been influenced by the work of his contemporary, the painter George Stubbs.

The figure has been periodically maintained, or "scoured", since its creation. In 1935 it was treated with a mixture of chalk and concrete, and it was cleaned again in 1994. A major restoration took place in 2002, when the Cherhill White Horse Restoration Group resurfaced the figure with approximately 160 tonnes of chalk, re-cut its outline, and added shuttering to retain the material. This work was supported by a grant of £18,000 from the National Trust. In May, 2026, the figure was weeded and new chalk added by 130 volunteers.

In the 19th century, the horse was given a glass eye formed from bottles inserted into the ground. These were later lost, and a similar feature added in the 1970s also disappeared. The current eye is constructed from stone and concrete and sits slightly raised above the surrounding chalk.

Writing in 1922, M. Oldfield Howey noted that the figure had fallen into disrepair during the First World War, but that restoration efforts were then under way.

During the week of the coronation of King George VI and Queen Elizabeth in 1937, the figure was floodlit, and the letters "GE" were illuminated above it in red lights powered by a generator at the base of the hill.

The land above the figure is owned by the National Trust.

Thirteen white horses are known to have existed in Wiltshire, of which eight remain visible today.

== See also ==
- Hill figure
- List of hill figures in Wiltshire
- Broad Town White Horse
- Marlborough White Horse
- Litlington White Horse

== Bibliography ==
- Plenderleath, W. C. (1872). On the White Horses of Wiltshire and Its Neighbourhood. Wilts Archaeological Magazine, 14, pp. 12–30.
- Plenderleath, W. C. (1885). White Horses of the West of England. London: Alfred Russell Smith.
- Marples, Morris (1949). White Horses & Other Hill Figures. London: Country Life Ltd.
- Bergamar, Kate (1997). Discovering Hill Figures (4th ed.). Shire Publications. ISBN 0-7478-0345-5
- Clensy, David (2023). Walking the White Horses: Wiltshire's White Horse Trail on Foot.
