= Listed parks and gardens in South East England =

The Register of Historic Parks and Gardens of Special Historic Interest in England, created in 1983, is administered by Historic England. It includes more than 1,600 sites, ranging from gardens of private houses, to cemeteries and public parks.

There are 386 registered parks and gardens in South East England. 43 are listed at grade I, the highest grade, 120 at grade II*, the middle grade, and 223 at grade II, the lowest grade.

== Key ==
Grade	Criteria
I	Parks and gardens of exceptional interest, sometimes considered to be internationally important
II*	Particularly important parks and gardens of more than special interest
II	Parks and gardens of national importance and special interest

== Parks and gardens ==
=== Berkshire ===
Name	Grade	Location	Type	Completed (Note: The date given is the date used by Historic England as significant for the initial building or that of an important part in the structure's description.)	Grid ref. (Note: The grid reference is based on the British national grid reference system, sometimes known as OSGB36, used by the Ordnance Survey.) Geo-coordinates	Entry number (Note: The "List Entry Number" is a unique number assigned to each listed building and scheduled monument by Historic England.)	Image
Aldermaston Court	II	Aldermaston	Park and garden	Late 19th century	SU5964064639	1000530	Aldermaston Court
Ascot Place	II*	Winkfield	Park and garden	Early 20th century	SU9113971659	1000580	Ascot Place
Basildon Park	II	Basildon	Park and garden	Mid 19th century	SU6060877730	1000581	Basildon Park
Bearwood House	II*	Barkham	Park and garden	1820s	SU 77598 68769	1000414	Bearwood House
Benham Park	II	Enborne	Park and garden	19th century	SU4348767848	1000173	Benham Park
Broadmoor Hospital	II	Crowthorne	Hospital grounds	1863	SU 84788 63344	1001401	Broadmoor Hospital
Caversham Court	II	Reading	Public park	17th century	SU7084774819	1000582	Caversham Court
Caversham Park	II	Reading	Park and garden	Mid 19th century	SU7257476164	1000524	Caversham Park
Deanery Garden	II*	Sonning	Garden	1901	SU7567875617	1000445	Deanery Garden
Ditton Park	II	Slough	Park and garden	1774	SU 99858 78078	1001290	Ditton Park
Donnington Grove	II	Speen	Park and garden	Late 18th century	SU 45873 68873	1000534	Donnington Grove
Englefield House	II	Bradfield	Park and garden	1935	SU 62312 71660	1000583	Englefield House
Eton College	II	Eton	School grounds	Mid-20th century	SU 97054 78208	1000584	Eton College
Farley Hall	II	Swallowfield	Park and garden	Mid-18th century	SU 74436 64721	1000526	Farley Hall
Folly Farm	II*	Sulhamstead	Garden	1915	SU 63081 68828	1000585	Folly Farm
Forbury Gardens	II	Reading	Public park	1861	SU 71868 73622	1000586	Forbury Gardens
Frogmore Gardens	I	Old Windsor	Garden	1790s	SU9751876014	1000587	Frogmore Gardens
Hall Place	II	Hurley	Landscape park	Late 17th century	SU 83412 82111	1001691	Hall Place
Hamstead Marshall Park	II	Enborne	Park and garden	19th century	SU 42723 66209	1000525	Hamstead Marshall Park
Herschel Park	II	Slough	Public park	1843	SU 97614 79174	1001648	Herschel Park
Inkpen House	II*	Inkpen	Garden	Early 18th century	SU 35823 63696	1000328	Inkpen House
Newbold College	II*	Binfield	Garden	1913	SU 84667 69999	1000547	Newbold College
Park Place and Temple Combe	II*	Wargrave	Park and garden	Late 19th century	SU 77850 81998	1000588	Park Place and Temple Combe
Prospect Park	II	Reading	Public park	1902	SU6883472440	1000589	Prospect Park
Purley Hall	II*	Purley on Thames	Park and garden	Mid-18th century	SU6443575768	1000590	Purley Hall
Reading Old Cemetery	II	Reading	Cemetery	1843	SU 73365 73207	1001641	Reading Old Cemetery
Royal Lodge	I	Old Windsor	Garden	1936	SU9692272053	1001435	Royal Lodge
Savill Garden and Valley Gardens	I	Old Windsor	Garden	1939	SU 97281 69466	1001176	Savill Garden and Valley Gardens
Shaw House	II	Newbury	Garden	Early-17th century	SU 47535 68238	1001446	Shaw House
South Hill Park	II	Bracknell	Park and garden	Late 19th century	SU 87002 66902	1000591	South Hill Park
Sunningdale Park	II	Sunningdale	Park and garden	1890s	SU 94762 67807	1001667	Sunningdale Park
Swallowfield Park	II	Swallowfield	Park and garden	18th century	SU7340065277	1000537	Swallowfield Park
Virginia Water	I	Old Windsor	Lake	1750	SU 97251 68505	1001177	Virginia Water
Wasing Place	II	Aldermaston	Park and garden	19th century	SU 57688 64327	1000511	Wasing Place
Windsor Castle and Home Park	I	Windsor	Park and garden	1820s	SU 97679 76466	1001434	Windsor Castle and Home Park
Windsor Great Park	I	Old Windsor	Hunting park	Mediaeval	SU 98582 68851	1000592	Windsor Great Park

=== Buckinghamshire ===
Name	Grade	Location	Type	Completed	Grid ref. Geo-coordinates	Entry number	Image
Ascott House	II*	Wing	Park and garden	1880s	SP 89582 22741	1000593	Ascott House
Berry Hill	II	Taplow	Park and garden	1860	SU 90718 81599	1000135	Upload Photo
Bradenham Manor	II	Bradenham	Park and garden	Late 17th century	SU 83092 97206	1001418	Bradenham Manor
Broadwater Park	II	Denham	Office grounds	1984	TQ0420688507	1466908	Upload Photo
Bulstrode Park	II*	Gerrards Cross	Park and garden	1790s	SU9849288361	1001371	Bulstrode Park
Campbell Park	II	Milton Keynes	Public park	1984	SP8642639535	1467405	Campbell Park
Chenies Manor House	II*	Chenies	Garden	1893	TQ0150698702	1000594	Chenies Manor House
Chequers	II	Ellesborough	Park and garden	1912	SP8303006001	1000595	Chequers
Chicheley Hall	II*	Chicheley	Park and garden	1700	SP 90607 45944	1000596	Chicheley Hall
Claydon House	II	Middle Claydon	Park and garden	Late 18th century	SP7149825593	1000597	Claydon House
Cliveden	I	Hedsor	Park and garden	1737	SU9100085080	1000323	Cliveden
Denham Place	II	Denham	Landscape park	1770s	TQ 03939 87291	1000598	Denham Place
Dropmore Park	II	Burnham	Park and garden	1820s	SU 92343 85388	1000599	Dropmore Park
Eythrope	II	Fleet Marston	Park and garden	Late 19th century	SP 76668 13473	1001397	Eythrope
Fawley Court and Temple Island	II*	Fawley	Park and garden	1770s	SU 76497 84011	1000390	Fawley Court and Temple Island
Gayhurst House	II	Stoke Goldington	Park and garden	1760	SP 84650 46420	1000600	Gayhurst House
Hall Barn	II*	Beaconsfield	Park and garden	1710s	SU9360189207	1000334	Hall Barn
Harleyford Manor	II	Great Marlow	Park and garden	Mid 18th century	SU 82805 84854	1000543	Harleyford Manor
Halton House	I	Aston Clinton	Park and garden	1880s	SP 88158 10020	1000601	Halton House
Hartwell House	II*	Stone with Bishopstone and Hartwell	Park and garden	Mid 18th century	SP 79801 12583	1000192	Hartwell House
Hedsor House	II	Taplow	Park and garden	Late 18th century	SU 91160 85836	1001373	Hedsor House
Hughenden Manor	II	Downley	Park and garden	19th century	SU 85655 94619	1000318	Hughenden Manor
Huntercombe Manor	II	Burnham	Garden	1870s	SU 93269 80640	1000602	Huntercombe Manor
Langley Park	II	Wexham	Park and garden	Mid 18th century	TQ 00906 81782	1000603	Langley Park
Latimer House	II	Little Chalfont	Landscape park	1750s	SU 99484 98861	1000370	Latimer House
Mentmore Towers	II*	Cheddington	Park and garden	1853	SP 90480 19125	1000319	Mentmore Towers
Milton's Cottage	II	Chalfont St Giles	Garden	1880s	SU 98872 93280	1000604	Milton's Cottage
Missenden Abbey	II	Great Missenden	Landscape park	1815	SP 90052 00664	1000605	Missenden Abbey
Nashdom Abbey	II	Burnham	Garden	1909	SU 92019 84145	1000606	Nashdom Abbey
Shardeloes	II*	Amersham	Landscape park	1770s	SU 93761 96992	1000425	Shardeloes
Stockgrove House formal gardens	II	Stockgrove	Garden	1938	SP9158529514	1434590	Stockgrove House formal gardens
Stoke Park	II	Farnham Royal	Landscape park	1750	SU9670082846	1000363	Stoke Park
Stoke Place	II	Stoke Poges	Park and garden	Mid 18th century	SU9831382024	1436431	Stoke Place
Stoke Poges Memorial Gardens	I	Stoke Poges	Memorial garden	1937	SU 97478 82506	1001255	Stoke Poges Memorial Gardens
Stowe Gardens	I	Stowe	Park and garden	Mid 18th century	SP 67511 38301	1000198	Stowe Gardens
Taplow Court	II	Taplow	Park and garden	Early 18th century	SU9061082553	1000607	Taplow Court
Turn End	II	Haddenham	Garden	1976	SP7394308670	1445345	Upload Photo
Tyringham Hall	II*	Gayhurst	Park and garden	1793	SP 85706 46806	1000476	Tyringham Hall
Waddesdon Manor	I	Upper Winchendon	Park and garden	1870s	SP7278116073	1000446	Waddesdon Manor
Wavendon House landscape	II	Wavendon	Park and garden	1772	SP9249037631	1458292	Upload Photo
West Wycombe Park	I	West Wycombe	Landscape park	18th century	SU8301094251	1000447	West Wycombe Park
Wotton House	I	Wotton Underwood	Landscape park	Mid 18th century	SP 68532 16192	1000608	Wotton House
Wycombe Abbey	II	High Wycombe	Landscape park	1760s	SU8655092360	1000609	Wycombe Abbey

=== East Sussex ===
Name	Grade	Location	Type	Completed	Grid ref. Geo-coordinates	Entry number	Image
Alexandra Park	II*	Hastings	Public park	1864	TQ 80961 10453	1001384	Alexandra Park
Ashburnham Place	II*	Penhurst	Park and garden	1767	TQ 69715 14287	1000145	Ashburnham Place
Bateman's	II	Burwash	Garden	1936	TQ 67069 23795	1000734	Bateman's
Battle Abbey	II	Battle	Park and garden	19th century	TQ 74769 15398	1000309	Battle Abbey
Brickwall House	II*	Beckley	Park and garden	19th century	TQ 83433 23578	1000177	Brickwall House
Brightling Park	II	Brightling	Landscape park	Early 19th century	TQ 67084 20605	1001261	Brightling Park
Buckhurst Park	II*	Withyham	Park and garden	18th century	TQ4978934894	1000230	Buckhurst Park
Buxted Park	II*	Buxted	Park and garden	18th century	TQ4795522945	1000308	Buxted Park
Charleston Manor	II*	Cuckmere Valley	Garden	1932	TQ 52018 00662	1000164	Charleston Manor
Compton Place	II	Eastbourne	Garden	18th century	TV6018798578	1000735	Compton Place
Eridge Park	II*	Frant	Landscape park	1822	TQ 57533 34287	1000265	Eridge Park
Firle Place	II	Firle	Park and garden	19th century	TQ 47496 07424	1000235	Firle Place
Frant Court	II	Frant	Garden	1916	TQ 58819 35224	1001178	Frant Court
Glen Andred Garden	II*	Withyham	Garden	1880	TQ 52896 35790	1001709	Glen Andred Garden
Glynde Place	II*	Glynde	Park and garden	19th century	TQ4552609221	1000307	Glynde Place
Great Dixter	I	Northiam	Garden	1911	TQ 81987 25098	1000736	Great Dixter
Groombridge Place	II*	Withyham	Garden	Mid 17th century	TQ 53430 37644	1000933	Groombridge Place
Hammerwood Park	II	Forest Row	Park and garden	Late 18th century	TQ 43971 38534	1000306	Hammerwood Park
Heathfield Park	II	Heathfield and Waldron	Park and garden	17th century	TQ 59317 20876	1000203	Heathfield Park
Herstmonceaux Castle and Herstmonceux Place	II*	Herstmonceaux	Landscape park	15th century	TQ 64645 10713	1000231	Herstmonceaux Castle and Herstmonceux Place
The Hoo	II*	Willingdon and Jevington	Garden	1902	TQ 58887 02377	1000236	The Hoo
Horsted Place	II	Little Horsted	Garden	1960s	TQ 46927 18431	1000202	Horsted Place
Kemp Town Enclosures	II	Kemp Town	Gardens	1823	TQ 32972 03482	1001313	Kemp Town Enclosures
Kidbrooke Park	II	Forest Row	Park and garden	1808	TQ 41836 34124	1000305	Kidbrooke Park
Newick Park	II	Chailey	Landscape park	Late 18th century	TQ 42140 19150	1000232	Newick Park
Penns in the Rocks	II*	Withyham	Garden	1953	TQ 51784 34667	1000233	Penns in the Rocks
Plumpton Place	II*	Plumpton	Garden	1927	TQ 36040 13498	1000234	Plumpton Place
Preston Manor and Preston Park	II	Brighton	Public park	1884	TQ 30563 06266	1000204	Preston Manor and Preston Park
Queen's Park	II	Brighton	Public park	1892	TQ 32106 04467	1001319	Queen's Park
Rotherfield Hall	II*	Rotherfield	Garden	1897	TQ 54274 28981	1000366	Rotherfield Hall
Royal Pavilion	II	Brighton	Garden	1825	TQ 31244 04227	1000205	Royal Pavilion
St Leonard's Gardens	II	St Leonards-on-Sea	Public park	1829	TQ 79859 08923	1001385	St Leonard's Gardens
Sheffield Park and Garden	I	Fletching	Park and garden	1790	TQ4128823969	1000146	Sheffield Park and Garden
Stanmer Park	II	Ditchling	Park and garden	1730	TQ3266910501	1001447	Stanmer Park
Ticehurst House Hospital	II*	Ticehurst	Hospital grounds	1816	TQ 67979 30437	1001600	Ticehurst House Hospital
Wadhurst Castle	II	Wadhurst	Park and garden	Mid 19th century	TQ 63346 31429	1001272	Wadhurst Castle
Woodvale Cemetery	II	Brighton	Cemetery	1857	TQ 32601 05688	1000222	Woodvale Cemetery
Wootton Manor	II	Long Man	Garden	1919	TQ 56564 04796	1001693	Wootton Manor
Wych Cross Hall	II*	Danehill	Park and garden	1901	TQ 41500 31547	1000515	Wych Cross Hall

=== Hampshire ===
Name	Grade	Location	Type	Completed	Grid ref. Geo-coordinates	Entry number	Image
Amport House	II	Amport	Park and garden	1923	SU 29741 43700	1000858	Amport House
Avington Park	II*	Itchen Valley	Park and garden	Mid 18th century	SU5243131764	1000529	Avington Park
Avon Tyrrell House	II	Sopley	Garden	Late 19th century	SU 18267 00311	1001583	Avon Tyrrell House
Awbridge Danes	II	Awbridge	Park and garden	1820s	SU 32130 22708	1001287	Awbridge Danes
Basing House	II	Old Basing and Lychpit	Garden	18th century	SU6614952644	1000138	Basing House
Bramdean House	II	Bramdean and Hinton Ampner	Garden	1920s	SU6123828185	1000859	Bramdean House
Bramshill House	I	Bramshill	Park and garden	Early 18th century	SU7626960141	1000165	Bramshill House
Breamore House	II	Breamore	Landscape park	18th century	SU 15099 19105	1000329	Breamore House
Broadlands	II*	Romsey Extra	Park and garden	Late 18th century	SU3560220056	1000166	Broadlands
Brockenhurst Park	II	Brockenhurst	Landscape park	1770s	SU 31134 01710	1000499	Brockenhurst Park
Cadland House	II*	Fawley	Landscape park	1770s	SZ 46890 99805	1000280	Cadland House
Central Parks	II*	Southampton	Public park	1850s	SU4164512371	1001323	Central Parks
Chawton House	II	Farringdon	Park and garden	1820s	SU7087436893	1000421	Chawton House
Clayhall Royal Naval Cemetery	II	Gosport	Cemetery	1859	SZ6098298612	1435448	Clayhall Royal Naval Cemetery
Compton End	II*	Compton and Shawford	Garden	1914	SU 46249 25864	1000278	Compton End
Cranbury Park	II*	Hursley	Park and garden	Late 18th century	SU 44498 23154	1000860	Cranbury Park
Dogmersfield Park	II	Dogmersfield	Park and garden	Late 18th century	SU 76902 51801	1000297	Dogmersfield Park
Elvetham Hall	II	Hartley Wintney	Park and garden	1591	SU 77868 56619	1000250	Elvetham Hall
Embley Park	II	Wellow	Park and garden	Early 20th century	SU 32390 20704	1000215	Embley Park
Exbury House	II*	Beaulieu	Garden	1939	SU 42174 00183	1000167	Exbury House
The Grange	II*	Northington	Mid 18th century	Park and garden	SU5561836505	1000296	The Grange
Hackwood Park	I	Winslade	Landscape park	Early 18th century	SU 65435 49591	1000332	Hackwood Park
Hale Park	II*	Hale	Park and garden	Early 18th century	SU1791018737	1000298	Hale Park
Heckfield Place	II	Heckfield	Park and garden	Early 19th century	SU 73326 61077	1001379	Heckfield Place
Herriard Park	II	Winslade	Park and garden	1799	SU6617547019	1000861	Herriard Park
Highclere Park	I	Burghclere	Park and garden	Late 18th century	SU4498459143	1000109	Highclere Park
Houghton Lodge	II*	Houghton	Landscape park	1800	SU 34389 33065	1000168	Houghton Lodge
Hurstbourne Park	II*	Hurstbourne Priors	Landscape park	Late 18th century	SU4415748274	1000216	Hurstbourne Park
Kingston Cemetery	II	Portsmouth	Cemetery	1856	SU 65781 00925	1001679	Kingston Cemetery
Lainston House	II*	Sparsholt	Park and garden	Early 18th century	SU 44643 31673	1000862	Lainston House
Laverstoke Park	II	Overton	Landscape park	Early 19th century	SU 49532 48909	1000473	Laverstoke Park
Little Boarhunt	II	Bramshott and Liphook	Garden	1910	SU8383730713	1000863	Little Boarhunt
Magdalen Hill Cemetery	II	Chilcomb	Cemetery	1914	SU 51247 29288	1000310	Magdalen Hill Cemetery
The Manor House	II*	Upton Grey	Garden	1909	SU 69779 48497	1000277	The Manor House
Marshcourt	II*	Kings Somborne	Garden	1904	SU3562333794	1000149	Marshcourt
Military Cemetery	II*	Aldershot	Cemetery	1854	SU 87512 51380	1000749	Military Cemetery
Minley Manor	II	Blackwater and Hawley	Garden	1884	SU 83161 57742	1001264	Minley Manor
Mottisfont Abbey	II	Mottisfont	Garden	1930s	SU3254427194	1000864	Mottisfont Abbey
Moundsmere Abbey	II*	Preston Candover	Garden	1909	SU 62531 43215	1000865	Moundsmere Abbey
Mountbatten House	II	Basingstoke	Roof garden	1976	SU6467852520	1422221	Mountbatten House
Old Alresford House	II	Old Alresford	Landscape park	1764	SU 59028 33649	1000481	Old Alresford House
Pylewell Park	II*	Boldre	Park and garden	Late 18th century	SZ 35275 95456	1000169	Pylewell Park
Rhinefield House	II	Brockenhurst	Garden	1850s	SU 26557 03747	1000490	Rhinefield House
Rotherfield Park	II*	Colemore and Priors Dean	Landscape park	Early 19th century	SU6952332663	1000163	Rotherfield Park
The Royal Hospital	II	Haslar	Hospital grounds	1762	SZ 61738 98671	1001558	The Royal Hospital
Royal Victoria Country Park	II	Hamble-le-Rice	Hospital grounds	1863	SU 46478 07854	1001584	Royal Victoria Country Park
Sandleford Priory	II	Newtown	Landscape park	1780s	SU4743264564	1000333	Sandleford Priory
Sir Harold Hillier Gardens	II	Braishfield	Arboretum and garden	1950s	SU 37686 23904	1001367	Sir Harold Hillier Gardens
Southampton Old Cemetery	II*	Southampton	Cemetery	1846	SU 41372 13767	1001324	Southampton Old Cemetery
Southsea Common	II	Southsea	Public park	1922	SZ 64299 98267	1001624	Southsea Common
Sparsholt Manor Garden	II	Sparsholt	Garden	1923	SU 43816 31302	1001704	Upload Photo
Stratfield Saye House	II	Stratfield Turgis	Park and garden	Late 18th century	SU 70428 61738	1000866	Stratfield Saye House
Staunton Country Park	II*	Havant	Park and garden	1830s	SU 71991 08944	1000112	Staunton Country Park
Stratton Park	II	Micheldever	Landscape park	Early 19th century	SU 54298 40984	1000867	Stratton Park
Townhill Park House	II	Southampton	Arboretum and garden	1912	SU 45100 15091	1000868	Townhill Park House
Tylney Hall	II*	Newnham	Park and garden	1904	SU 71447 55561	1000176	Tylney Hall
Victoria Park	II	Portsmouth	Public park	1878	SU 63947 00339	1000869	Victoria Park
The Vyne	II	Sherborne St John	Garden	18th century	SU6297657006	1000870	The Vyne
The Wakes	II*	Selborne	Park and garden	1760s	SU 73984 33436	1000871	The Wakes
Warbrook House	II*	Eversley	Landscape park	1764	SU7691961766	1000249	Warbrook House
Warnford Park	II	West Meon	Landscape park	Mid 18th century	SU6227722752	1001334	Warnford Park

=== Isle of Wight ===
Name	Grade	Location	Type	Completed	Grid ref. Geo-coordinates	Entry number	Image
Appuldurcombe House	II	Ventnor	Park and garden	Late 18th century	SZ5381080218	1000926	Appuldurcombe House
Norris Castle	I	East Cowes	Park and garden	Early 19th century	SZ 51498 96061	1000927	Norris Castle
Northcourt Manor	II	Shorwell	Park and garden	Early 19th century	SZ 45781 83202	1001666	Northcourt Manor
Nunwell House	II	Brading	Park and garden	Early 19th century	SZ 59699 87436	1000928	Nunwell House
Osborne House	II*	Whippingham	Park and garden	1861	SZ 52172 95215	1000929	Osborne House
Swainston Manor	II	Calbourne, Newtown and Porchfield	Garden	Late 18th century	SZ4393788082	1000930	Swainston Manor
Ventnor Botanic Garden	II	Ventnor	Botanic garden	1869	SZ 54791 76857	1001598	Ventnor Botanic Garden
Westover	II	Calbourne, Newtown and Porchfield	Park and garden	19th century	SZ 41564 85189	1000931	Westover
Woodlands Vale	II	Ryde	Garden	1912	SZ6148991660	1406522	Woodlands Vale

=== Kent ===
Name	Grade	Location	Type	Completed	Grid ref. Geo-coordinates	Entry number	Image
Albion Place Gardens	II	Ramsgate	Public park	1822	TR 38463 64860	1001386	Albion Place Gardens
Bayham Abbey	II	Lamberhurst	Park and garden	1870	TQ 64079 36608	1000257	Bayham Abbey
Bedgebury National Pinetum	II	Goudhurst	Arboretum	1920s	TQ 72070 33579	1000932	Bedgebury National Pinetum
Belmont House and Gardens	II	Throwley	Garden	Early 19th century	TQ9831256532	1000293	Belmont House and Gardens
Benenden School	II	Cranbrook and Sissinghurst	Park and garden	Mid 19th century	TQ 80303 33919	1000195	Benenden School
Boughton Monchelsea Place	II	Boughton Monchelsea	Park and garden	Late 17th century	TQ 77339 49870	1000339	Boughton Monchelsea Place
Broome Park	II	Barham	Park and garden	1916	TR 21650 48538	1001457	Broome Park
Calverley Park and Calverley Grounds	II	Tunbridge Wells	Public park	1839	TQ 58820 39298	1000266	Calverley Park and Calverley Grounds
Chartwell	II*	Westerham	Garden	Mid 20th century	TQ 45631 51776	1000263	Chartwell
Chevening	II*	Knockholt	Park and garden	1770s	TQ4775458038	1000258	Chevening
Chiddingstone Castle	II	Chiddingstone	Landscape park	Early 19th century	TQ 49868 45083	1000399	Chiddingstone Castle
Chilham Castle	II*	Chilham	Park and garden	17th century	TR0622052790	1000261	Chilham Castle
Chilston Park	II	Boughton Malherbe	Park and garden	18th century	TQ 89486 49628	1000522	Chilston Park
Cobham Hall	II*	Cuxton	Park and garden	Early 19th century	TQ6782568834	1000182	Cobham Hall
Dane John Gardens	II	Canterbury	Public park	1790	TR 14799 57405	1001360	Dane John Gardens
Doddington Place Gardens	II	Doddington	Park and garden	1875	TQ 94430 57494	1000398	Doddington Place Gardens
Dunorlan Park	II	Tunbridge Wells	Public park	1850s	TQ 59867 38995	1001629	Dunorlan Park
Franks Hall	II	Farningham	Park and garden	1860s	TQ 55649 67523	1000325	Franks Hall
Godinton House	II*	Great Chart with Singleton	Park and garden	1919	TQ 98309 43789	1000151	Godinton House
Godmersham Park	II*	Godmersham	Park and garden	18th century	TR 05674 51238	1000290	Godmersham Park
Goodnestone Park	II*	Goodnestone	Park and garden	19th century	TR 25473 54136	1000260	Goodnestone Park
Great Maytham Hall	II	Rolvenden	Park and garden	1910s	TQ 84569 30799	1000221	Great Maytham Hall
Groombridge Place	II*	Speldhurst	Park and garden	17th century	TQ 53430 37644	1000933	Groombridge Place
Hall Place	II*	Leigh	Park and garden	1872	TQ 54483 46991	1000934	Hall Place
Hartridge House	II	Cranbrook and Sissinghurst	Garden	1907	TQ 77997 39073	1001289	Upload Photo
Hatch Park	II	Brabourne	Landscape park	Mid 18th century	TR 05949 40578	1001291	Hatch Park
Hever Castle	I	Chiddingstone	Park and garden	Early 20th century	TQ 48246 45500	1000152	Hever Castle
Ightham Court	II	Ightham	Garden	Early 18th century	TQ5946457632	1000405	Ightham Court
The Japanese Garden	II*	Seal	Garden	1921	TQ 56764 54225	1000936	Upload Photo
Jewish Burial Ground	II	Rochester	Cemetery	1780	TQ7511467890	1482982	Jewish Burial Ground
Kearsney Court	II	Temple Ewell	Park and garden	1900	TR 28524 43838	1001696	Kearsney Court
Knole	I	Seal	Park and garden	16th century	TQ5353553785	1000183	Knole
Leeds Castle	II*	Broomfield and Kingswood	Park and garden	Mediaeval	TQ8301053699	1000184	Leeds Castle
Lees Court	II	Selling	Park and garden	1908	TR 02338 54936	1000388	Lees Court
Linton Park	II*	Linton	Park and garden	Mid 19th century	TQ7587649911	1000264	Linton Park
Long Barn	II*	Sevenoaks Weald	Garden	1925	TQ 52667 50556	1000937	Long Barn
Lullingstone Castle	II	Eynsford	Park and garden	Late 18th century	TQ 51914 64546	1001687	Lullingstone Castle
Mabledon	II	Southborough	Park and garden	1831	TQ 57733 44648	1001296	Mabledon
Mereworth Castle	II*	Wateringbury	Park and garden	Mid 18th century	TQ6654453174	1000938	Mereworth Castle
Mote Park	II	Maidstone	Landscape park	1839	TQ 77806 54849	1001481	Mote Park
Mount Ephraim Gardens	II	Hernhill	Park and garden	1910s	TR 06540 60057	1000256	Mount Ephraim Gardens
Northbourne Court	II*	Great Mongeham	Park and garden	Early 17th century	TR 33829 52264	1000180	Northbourne Court
The Officers' Terrace	II	Chatham	Gardens	1731	TQ 76009 69139	1000376	The Officers' Terrace
Olantigh	II	Godmersham	Park and garden	1910s	TR 06061 48093	1000295	Olantigh
Oxen Hoath	II*	West Peckham	Park and garden	1840s	TQ 63048 51683	1001355	Oxen Hoath
Penshurst Place	I	Penshurst	Park and garden	17th century	TQ 53019 44868	1000153	Penshurst Place
Port Lympne Mansion	II*	Lympne	Garden	1910s	TR 10323 34865	1000939	Port Lympne Mansion
Radnor House Sevenoaks School	II*	Sundridge with Ide Hill	Park and garden	1740s	TQ 47874 55791	1000365	Radnor House Sevenoaks School
Redleaf	II	Leigh	Park and garden	Early 19th century	TQ 52071 45316	1000409	Upload Photo
Riverhill House	II	Seal	Park and garden	Mid 19th century	TQ 54271 51922	1000294	Riverhill House
The Salutation	II	Sandwich	Garden	1912	TR 33398 58105	1000940	The Salutation
Sandling Park	II	Saltwood	Park and garden	1890s	TR 13805 36367	1000262	Sandling Park
Scotney Castle	I	Lamberhurst	Park and garden	1830s	TQ 68621 35296	1000179	Scotney Castle
Sissinghurst Castle Garden	I	Cranbrook and Sissinghurst	Garden	1930s	TQ 80658 38208	1000181	Sissinghurst Castle Garden
Sissinghurst Court	II	Cranbrook and Sissinghurst	Garden	1930	TQ7887437403	1000941	Upload Photo
Somerhill House	II	Capel	Park and garden	1810s	TQ 60720 44785	1000381	Somerhill House
Squerryes Court	II	Westerham	Park and garden	18th century	TQ4418253225	1000223	Squerryes Court
Stonewall Park	II	Chiddingstone	Park and garden	1840s	TQ 50430 42374	1000267	Upload Photo
Swaylands	II	Bidborough	Park and garden	1870s	TQ 53343 42959	1001280	Swaylands
Waldershare Park	II	Tilmanstone	Landscape park	18th century	TR 28725 47862	1000259	Waldershare Park
Walmer Castle	II	Walmer	Park and garden	19th century	TR 37579 50111	1000291	Walmer Castle
Woodbury Park Cemetery	II	Tunbridge Wells	Cemetery	1849	TQ 58491 40155	1001665	Woodbury Park Cemetery

=== Oxfordshire ===
Name	Grade	Location	Type	Completed	Grid ref. Geo-coordinates	Entry number	Image
Albert Park	II	Abingdon-on-Thames	Public park	1862	SU 49210 97319	1001403	Albert Park
Ascott Park	II	Newington	Park and garden	17th century	SU 61067 98169	1001086	Ascott Park
Ashdown House	II*	Ashbury	Park and garden	19th century	SU 28295 81637	1000502	Ashdown House
Beckley Park	II*	Beckley and Stowood	Park and garden	Early 20th century	SP5774212021	1001087	Beckley Park
Blenheim Palace	I	Woodstock	Park and garden	Mid 18th century	SP4348816661	1000434	Blenheim Palace
Broughton Castle	II	Tadmarton	Park and garden	18th century	SP4154938521	1001088	Broughton Castle
Buckland House	II*	Buckland	Park and garden	Mid 18th century	SU 33949 98071	1000554	Buckland House
Buscot Park	II*	Great Faringdon	Park and garden	1913	SU 25189 96686	1001089	Buscot Park
Chastleton House	II*	Chastleton	Park and garden	17th century	SP 24853 28982	1001090	Chastleton House
Christ Church College	I	Oxford	College grounds	16th century	SP5166105679	1000441	Christ Church College
Compton Beauchamp House	II	Compton Beauchamp	Garden	18th century	SU 27992 86900	1001091	Compton Beauchamp House
Cornbury Park	II*	Charlbury	Park and garden	1680s	SP 34725 18090	1001092	Cornbury Park
Cornwell Manor	II	Cornwell	Park and garden	1939	SP2725427340	1001093	Cornwell Manor
Corpus Christi College	II	Oxford	College grounds	18th century	SP 51628 06036	1001094	Corpus Christi College
Ditchley Park	II*	Kiddington with Asterleigh	Park and garden	18th century	SP3863321232	1000463	Ditchley Park
Eynsham Hall	II	North Leigh	Park and garden	1908	SP 39496 11967	1001288	Eynsham Hall
Fair Mile Hospital	II	South Stoke	Hospital grounds	1872	SU 59921 85909	1001476	Fair Mile Hospital
Friar Park	II	Henley-on-Thames	Park and garden	1880s	SU 75401 82913	1000504	Friar Park
Garsington Manor	II*	Garsington	Garden	1920s	SP 58196 01876	1001095	Garsington Manor
Great Tew	II	Sandford St Martin	Landscape park	1811	SP 40185 28972	1001550	Great Tew
Greys Court	II	Rotherfield Greys	Park and garden	18th century	SU 72473 83534	1001096	Greys Court
Heythrop Park	II*	Enstone	Park and garden	Early 18th century	SP3515327318	1000489	Heythrop Park
High Wall	II	Oxford	Garden	1912	SP 53400 07010	1001408	Upload Photo
Hinton Manor	II	Hinton Waldrist	Park and garden	17th century	SU3709898794	1001097	Hinton Manor
The Japanese Garden at the New House	II*	Shipton-under-Wychwood	Garden	1965	SP2809317950	1408334	Upload Photo
Kelmscott Manor	II	Kelmscott	Garden	Late 19th century	SU2502598872	1001420	Kelmscott Manor
Kiddington Hall	II	Kiddington with Asterleigh	Park and garden	Mid 18th century	SP4104722918	1001098	Kiddington Hall
Kirtlington Park	II	Kirtlington	Park and garden	1750s	SP 50976 19672	1001286	Kirtlington Park
Magdalen College	I	Oxford	College grounds	1578	SP5237606435	1000435	Magdalen College
Merton College	II	Oxford	College grounds	16th century	SP 51780 06081	1001099	Merton College
Middleton Park	II	Kirtlington	Park and garden	Early 19th century	SP 52409 21867	1001405	Middleton Park
New College	I	Oxford	College grounds	16th century	SP 51797 06446	1001100	New College
Nuneham House	I	Clifton Hampden	Park and garden	1782	SU5421097651	1000122	Nuneham House
University of Oxford Botanic Garden	I	Oxford	1620s	Botanical garden	SP 52031 06057	1000464	University of Oxford Botanic Garden
Park Town	II	Oxford	Public park	1857	SP 51241 07801	1001292	Park Town
Pusey House	II	Pusey	Park and garden	1930s	SU 36001 96786	1001101	Pusey House
Rousham House	I	Lower Heyford	Park and garden	1741	SP 47678 24234	1000107	Rousham House
St Catherine's College	I	Oxford	College grounds	1966	SP5223106627	1001388	St Catherine's College
St John's College	II	Oxford	College grounds	18th century	SP 51251 06704	1001103	St John's College
St Sepulchre's Cemetery	II	Oxford	Cemetery	1848	SP 50531 07198	1001682	St Sepulchre's Cemetery
Sandford Park	II	Sandford St Martin	Park and garden	1930s	SP4142627016	1001104	Sandford Park
Sarsden House	II*	Sarsden	Landscape park	1795	SP2886422858	1000503	Sarsden House
Shipton Court	II	Shipton-under-Wychwood	Garden	1900	SP 27613 17477	1001276	Shipton Court
Shirburn Castle	II	Pyrton	Park and garden	Early 19th century	SU6946396219	1001105	Shirburn Castle
Shotover Park	I	Holton	Park and garden	18th century	SP 58315 06767	1001106	Shotover Park
Stonor Park	II	Stonor	Park and garden	17th century	SU7391789089	1000436	Stonor Park
Sutton Courtenay Manor	II	Culham	Garden	1920s	SU 50184 94161	1001107	Sutton Courtenay Manor
Swerford Park	II	Swerford	Landscape park	1820s	SP 36468 31178	1001108	Swerford Park
Tackley Water Garden	II*	Tackley	Garden	1615	SP 47669 20340	1001109	Tackley Water Garden
Thame Park	II*	Thame	Landscape park	Late 18th century	SP 71467 03724	1001110	Thame Park
Trinity College	II	Oxford	College grounds	18th century	SP 51387 06546	1001111	Trinity College
University Parks	II	Oxford	Public park	1865	SP 51919 07160	1001651	University Parks
Wadham College	II	Oxford	College grounds	Late 18th century	SP 51558 06665	1001293	Wadham College
Worcester College	II*	Oxford	College grounds	18th century	SP 50723 06584	1000465	Worcester College
Wroxton Abbey	II*	Wroxton	Landscape park	18th century	SP4135141287	1000466	Wroxton Abbey
Yarnton Manor	II	Yarnton	Garden	Late 19th century	SP 47531 11559	1001248	Yarnton Manor

=== Surrey ===
Name	Grade	Location	Type	Completed	Grid ref. Geo-coordinates	Entry number	Image
Albury Park	I	Albury, Surrey	Park and garden	17th century	TQ 06407 47654	1000299	Albury Park
Ashtead Park	II	Ashtead	Park and garden	17th century	TQ 19348 58367	1001490	Ashtead Park
Bagshot Park	II	Windlesham	Park and garden	1880s	SU 90520 64068	1001381	Bagshot Park
Brookwood Cemetery	I	Brookwood	Cemetery	1852	SU 95377 55906	1001265	Brookwood Cemetery
Busbridge Lakes	II*	Godalming	Park	Mid-18th century	SU9756042420	1000301	Busbridge Lakes
Clandon Park House	II	West Clandon	Park and garden	1781	TQ0374051738	1001171	Clandon Park House
Claremont	I	Esher	Park and garden	Early 19th century	TQ1333363470	1000324	Claremont
Compton (Watts) Cemetery	II*	Compton	Cemetery	1898	SU9565147376	1417498	Compton (Watts) Cemetery
Cumberland Lodge	I	Englefield Green	Park and garden	18th century	SU9597071070	1001436	Cumberland Lodge
Deepdene House and Gardens	II*	Dorking	Park and garden	1810s	TQ1749748734	1000143	Deepdene House and Gardens
Farnham Park	II	Farnham	Park and garden	Early 19th century	SU 84159 48020	1001499	Farnham Park
Frimley Park	II	Frimley	Park and garden	1920	SU 87585 58323	1001472	Frimley Park
Great Fosters	II*	Egham	Garden	1918	TQ 01405 69844	1000303	Great Fosters
Greathed Manor	II	Dormansland	Park and garden	Early 20th century	TQ 41334 42063	1000272	Greathed Manor
Hascombe Court	II	Busbridge	Garden	1920s	SU 99404 39963	1001475	Hascombe Court
Hatchlands Park	II	East Clandon	Park and garden	1900	TQ0687052446	1001697	Hatchlands Park
Jellicoe Roof Garden	II	Guildford	Roof garden	1957	SU 99691 49512	1001474	Jellicoe Roof Garden
Kennedy Memorial Landscape	II	Runnymede	Memorial park	1965	SU9960472781	1467672	Kennedy Memorial Landscape
Littleworth Cross	II	Seale and Sands	Garden	1889	SU 89767 45698	1000279	Upload Photo
Lower Gatton Park	II	Gatton	Park and garden	1770s	TQ2720352669	1001409	Lower Gatton Park
Merrow Grange	II	Guildford	Garden	1907	TQ 02132 50438	1001172	Merrow Grange
Munstead Wood	I	Godalming	Garden	1932	SU 98233 42652	1000156	Munstead Wood
Norbury Park	II	Mickleham	Park and garden	Late 18th century	TQ 16342 53201	1001252	Norbury Park
Oatlands Palace	II	Oatlands	Landscape park	18th century	TQ0841765285	1000119	Oatlands Palace
Orchards	II*	Bramley	Garden	1890s	SU 99351 43286	1001174	Orchards
Painshill	I	Wisley	Park and garden	1773	TQ0925760198	1000125	Painshill
Peper Harow Park	II	Peper Harow	Landscape park	Late 18th century	SU9340743873	1435898	Peper Harow Park
Polesden Lacey	II*	Great Bookham	Park and garden	1761	TQ1398152424	1000300	Polesden Lacey
Pyrford Court	II	Pyrford	Garden	Early 20th century	TQ 03243 57996	1000229	Pyrford Court
Reigate Priory	II	Reigate	Park and garden	16th century	TQ 24969 49732	1001175	Reigate Priory
Royal Horticultural Society Gardens	II*	Wisley	Garden	1903	TQ0625858118	1000126	Royal Horticultural Society Gardens
St Ann's Court	II*	Chertsey	Garden	1938	TQ 02739 67245	1000518	St Ann's Court
St Ann's Hill and the Dingle	II	Chertsey	Public park	1928	TQ 02413 67761	1001527	St Ann's Hill and the Dingle
Sutton Place	II*	Send	Park and garden	Early 20th century	TQ 01252 53621	1001554	Sutton Place
Titsey Place	II	Titsey	Park and garden	Mid 19th century	TQ 40402 54825	1000121	Titsey Place
Vann	II*	Hambledon	Garden	1910s	SU 98337 37474	1000302	Vann
Westbrook	II	Godalming	Garden	Early 20th century	SU 96169 44281	1001671	Westbrook
Woburn Farm	II	Addlestone	Ferme ornée	1735	TQ0549865709	1000342	Woburn Farm
Wotton House	II*	Wotton	Garden	Mid 17th century	TQ1219046865	1000391	Wotton House

=== West Sussex ===
Name	Grade	Location	Type	Completed	Grid ref. Geo-coordinates	Entry number	Image
Arundel Castle	II*	Arundel	Park and garden	Mid 19th century	TQ 01399 09033	1000170	Arundel Castle
Bignor Park	II	Bignor	Park and garden	Mid 19th century	SU9902115851	1000273	Bignor Park
Blackdown Park	II	Lurgashall	Park and garden	Mid 19th century	SU9158628667	1001207	Blackdown Park
Borde Hill Garden	II*	Ansty and Staplefield	Park and garden	Mid 20th century	TQ 31891 26412	1000274	Borde Hill Garden
Brockhurst	II*	East Grinstead	Garden	1935	TQ 40667 37310	1000348	Upload Photo
Burton Park	II	Duncton	Park and garden	Early 20th century	SU9683018113	1001208	Burton Park
Cooke's House	II	Bury	Garden	1930s	TQ0003113893	1001209	Cooke's House
Cowdray House	II*	Easebourne	Park and garden	Late 18th century	SU9019622276	1001210	Cowdray House
Denmans Garden	II	Arundel	Garden	1985	SU9447907042	1468114	Denmans Garden
Fishbourne Roman Palace	II*	Fishbourne	Garden	1st century	SU 83961 04767	1001211	Fishbourne Roman Palace
Goodwood House	I	Westhampnett	Park and garden	Mid 18th century	SU 88732 09606	1000157	Goodwood House
Gravetye Manor	II*	West Hoathly	Garden	1935	TQ3613934129	1000158	Gravetye Manor
Graylingwell Hospital	II	Chichester	Hospital grounds	1897	SU 86623 06310	1001555	Graylingwell Hospital
Heaselands	II	Ansty and Staplefield	Garden	1970s	TQ 31140 22799	1000275	Heaselands
The High Beeches	II*	Slaugham	Garden	1966	TQ 27612 30688	1000200	The High Beeches
Highdown Gardens	II*	Worthing	Garden	1967	TQ 09788 04084	1001212	Highdown Gardens
Hollycombe House	II*	Milland	Garden	1870s	SU 84879 28636	1000304	Hollycombe House
King Edward VII Hospital	II	Easebourne	Hospital grounds	1906	SU 88004 24858	1001454	King Edward VII Hospital
Knepp Castle	II	Shipley	Park and garden	1813	TQ 15681 21701	1000519	Knepp Castle
Lavington Park	II	Duncton	Park and garden	19th century	SU9459316588	1001213	Lavington Park
Leonardslee	I	Lower Beeding	Garden	1920	TQ2219626121	1000159	Leonardslee
Little Thakeham	II*	Thakeham	Garden	1903	TQ 10922 15618	1001214	Little Thakeham
Nymans	II*	Ansty and Staplefield	Garden	Early 20th century	TQ 26538 29273	1000160	Nymans
Parham Park	II*	Parham	Park and garden	18th century	TQ 06007 14232	1000161	Parham Park
Petworth House	I	Petworth	Park and garden	Mid 18th century	SU9662722742	1000162	Petworth House
Pitshill and the Manor of Dean	II	Tillington	Park and garden	Late 19th century	SU 94738 22770	1000349	Pitshill and the Manor of Dean
Sedgwick Park	II	Nuthurst	Park and garden	1886	TQ 18328 26805	1001279	Sedgwick Park
Slaugham Place	II	Slaugham	Garden	Early 17th century	TQ 26037 27847	1001215	Slaugham Place
Standen	II	East Grinstead	Garden	1910	TQ 38896 35627	1001695	Standen
Stansted Park	II*	Stoughton	Park and garden	Late 19th century	SU 75266 11137	1000327	Stansted Park
Stonehurst	II	West Hoathly	Garden	1907	TQ 34807 31857	1000326	Upload Photo
Uppark	II*	Compton	Park and garden	Mid 18th century	SU7847017201	1000347	Uppark
Wakehurst	II*	Ardingly	Garden	Mid 20th century	TQ 33707 31221	1000189	Wakehurst
Warnham Court	II	Warnham	Park and garden	Late 19th century	TQ 15961 32804	1001413	Warnham Court
West Dean House	II*	Lavant	Park and garden	Early 19th century	SU8631211814	1000190	West Dean House
