= Brighton & Hove Breeze routes =

Series of Brighton & Hove bus routes

Breeze
- 77, 78, 79

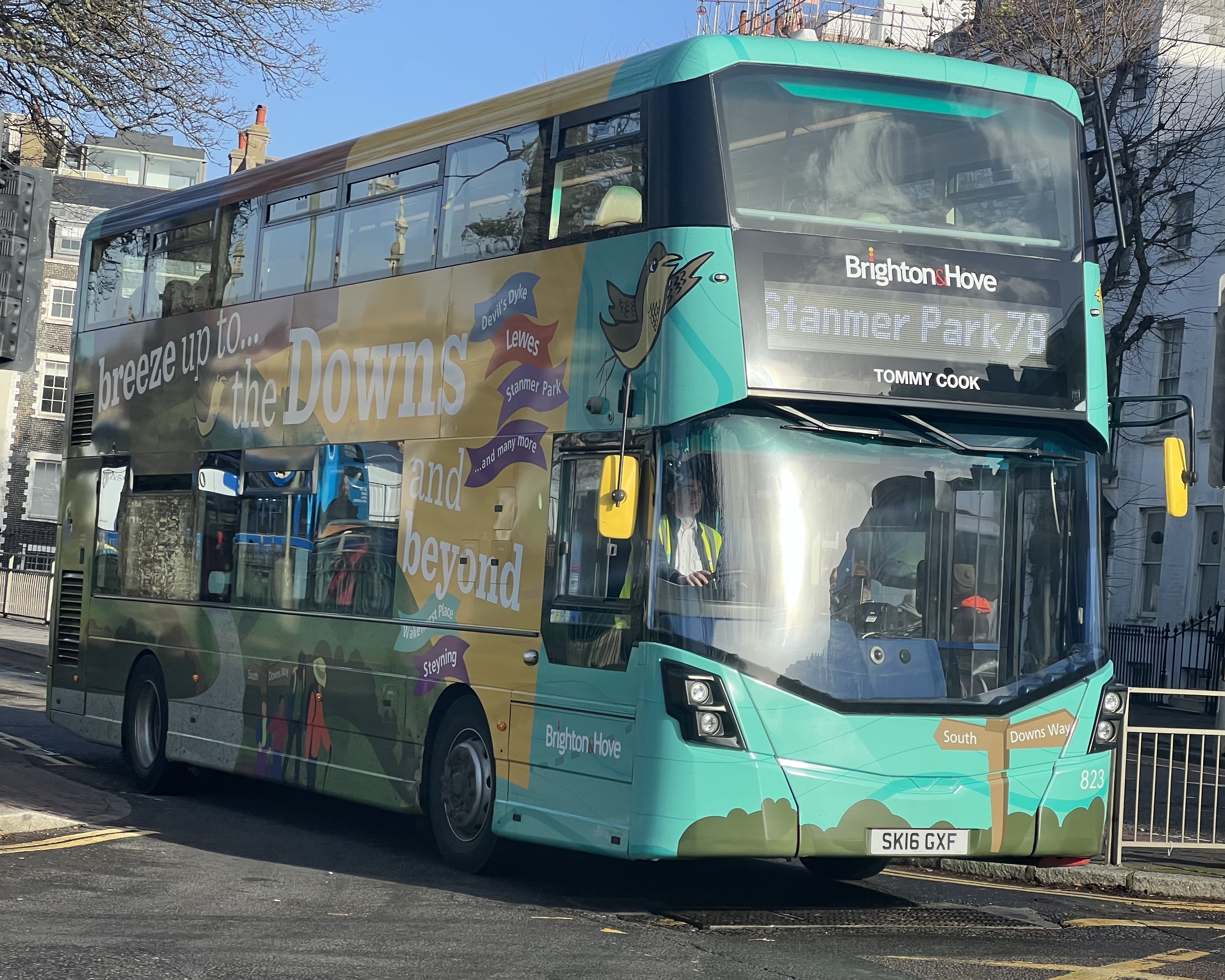
- A Breeze 78 on Old Steine in November 2023

Overview
- Operator: Brighton & Hove
- Vehicle: Wright StreetDeck
- Livery: Breeze up to the Downs

Route
- Start: Brighton city centre
- End: Devil's Dyke / Stanmer Village / Ditchling Beacon

Service
- Frequency: Every 45–75 minutes each way per route
- Journey time: 30 minutes
- Annual patronage: <300,000 per route
- Timetable: Breeze 77 timetable Breeze 78 timetable Breeze 79 timetable

Breeze is a brand name given to a group of three tourist-oriented bus routes, numbered 77, 78 and 79, operated by the Brighton & Hove bus company. The routes operate under the slogan "breeze up to the Downs and beyond" and link the city of Brighton with three popular countryside destinations within the South Downs National Park – respectively Devil's Dyke, Stanmer Village and Ditchling Beacon.

All three routes are funded, either partly or fully, by the Brighton and Hove City Council; route 77 also receives funding from the National Trust. In February 2024, the city council proposed withdrawing its subsidies for routes 77 and 79; the following month it announced that these routes would continue to receive funding for an additional year, after which they would have to operate on a commercial basis.

As of 2018, each of the three routes had ridership levels of under 300,000 passengers annually.

== Breeze 77 ==
Route 77 connects Brighton's city centre with Devil's Dyke – a dry valley in West Sussex managed by National Trust.

Within the city centre, the route runs in a large one-way loop, stopping at Brighton station, the Clock Tower, the Old Steine, Palace Pier, the Brighton i360 and Churchill Square before returning to the Clock Tower and Brighton station. North of the station, buses run mostly along Dyke Road, via the suburbs of Seven Dials, Prestonville, and the western edge of Westdene.

Route 77's service pattern varies depending on time of year. Between October and March, buses run approximately every 75 minutes each way on weekends only; from April to September, the frequency increases to every 45 minutes, while in the peak summer season, services run daily.

== Breeze 78 ==
Route 78 links Brighton's Old Steine with Stanmer – a small village within Brighton and Hove largely untouched by modern developments, situated well within the grade II listed local nature reserve of Stanmer Park. The route runs along Lewes Road, via the neighbourhoods of Elm Grove and Moulsecoomb.

The 78 is the only Breeze route to operate daily throughout the year. Buses run approximately every 70 minutes each way on all days, though services start later in the day on weekends.

== Breeze 79 ==
Route 79 operates between central Brighton and Ditchling Beacon – the highest point in East Sussex and the third-highest summit of the South Downs, at 248 metres above sea level. The route also passes close to the historic Hollingbury Hillfort, a scheduled monument located in Wild Park.

The route runs in a one-way loop in the city centre, serving the Old Steine, the Clock Tower, Brighton station and North Laine. Otherwise, it mostly follows Ditchling Road, running via the neighbourhoods of Round Hill, Fiveways, and the eastern edge of Hollingbury.

Buses on this route run every 70 minutes each way on Saturdays and Sundays year-round, with additional later services operating in the summer months. There is no weekday service.
