= William Masters (botanist) =

English botanist (1796–1874)

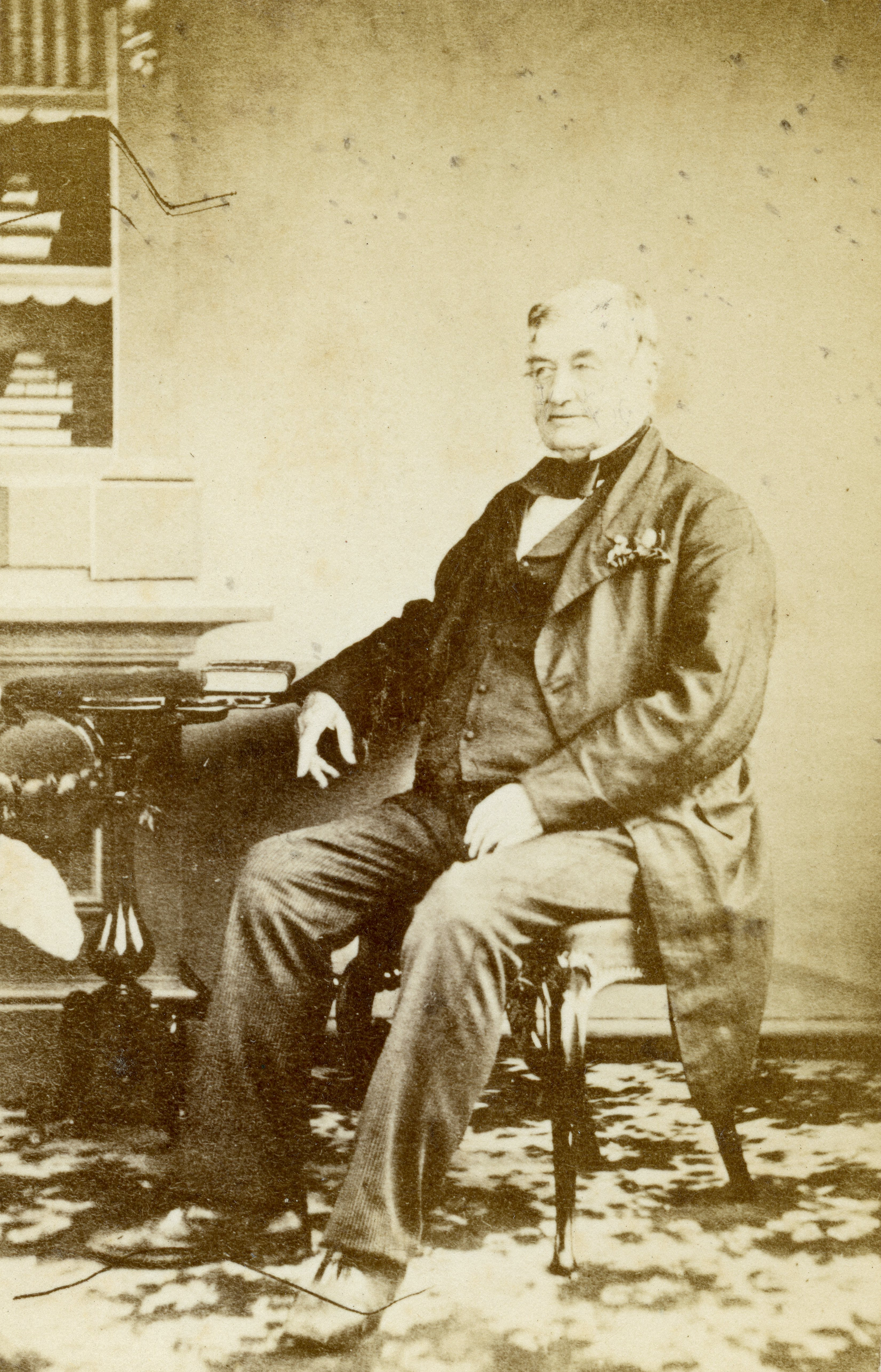
- Born: 7 July 1796; Canterbury, England, United Kingdom
- Died: 26 September 1874 (aged 78); Canterbury, England, United Kingdom
- Occupations: Nurseryman, garden designer, botanist
- Children: Maxwell T. Masters; William Arthur

William Masters (7 July 1796 – 26 September 1874) FHS was an English nurseryman, garden designer, and amateur botanist. He was a founder of the Canterbury Museum.

Masters was born at Canterbury, the son of another William Masters (d. 1834) and his wife Phebe. He founded a nursery in St. Peter's St., Canterbury, initially known as St Peter's Nursery Ground (Kent Gazette 1816), later as Master's Botanical Garden and Nursery Ground (Stapleton's Directory 1838), and later still as Master's Exotic Nursery. Masters specialized in the cultivation of exotic plants, and experimental hybridizations. He also founded the Canterbury Museum, of which he was Hon. Curator from 1823 to 1846. Masters replanted much of the Dane John Gardens in Canterbury with stock donated from his nursery, and also designed several of the terraces in the middle of the formal garden at Walmer Castle. However, Masters is chiefly remembered for his catalogue Hortus duroverni of 1831, which comprehensively listed and classified many seeds and plants. One of his introductions, the elm cultivar Ulmus × hollandica 'Superba', commonly known as the Canterbury Elm, became very popular as a street tree, notably in Germany, where it was propagated by the Spath nursery, Berlin.

Masters' sons William Arthur (1820–1847) and Maxwell Tylden (1837–1907) had distinguished careers in biology; William Jnr. became Curator of the Museum of Anatomy and Natural History at King's College London, while Maxwell was elected a Fellow of the Royal Society and Member of the Linnean Society, and lectured in botany at St. George's Hospital.

William Masters died aged 78 at Canterbury on 26 September 1874. His nursery business was taken over by his partner John Watson Kinmount.
