= Dane John Mound =

Roman cemetery in Canterbury, England

Coordinates: 51.27492°N 1.07783°E

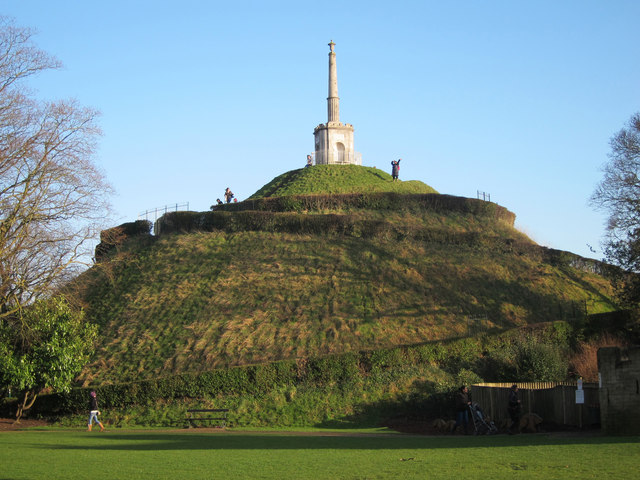
Dane John Mound

The Dane John Mound, also known as the Dane John Gardens, is a former Roman cemetery in the city of Canterbury, Kent. It was converted into a motte-and-bailey castle in the 11th century, and turned into a civic park between 1790 and 1803.

== History ==
The first construction on the Dane John site was a burial mound, built during the Roman occupation of Canterbury between the 1st and 4th centuries AD. In 1066, Canterbury was occupied by the Normans. William the Conqueror instructed that a castle was to be built in the city; it was built on the south side of the city using the Dane John mound and formed part of the circuit of defence, with property being destroyed to make room for it. This timber motte and bailey castle was later abandoned and the second Canterbury Castle was built just to the north in 1123.

The Dane John Gardens were built between 1790 and 1803 by alderman James Simmons, in the south-east corner of the walls, remodelling the old castle motte, and incorporating the Roman bank and the medieval wall-walk into the design, although their design was later accredited to William Masters, the Canterbury nurseryman. The ownership of the land was disputed, and the park was taken into the control of the city shortly after its construction.

During the Second World War, part of the city walls near the Dane John Gardens were turned into an ammunition depot, dug into the bank of the wall. The gardens are Grade II listed on the Register of Historic Parks and Gardens. The monument atop the mound and the sundial are each Grade II listed on the National Heritage List for England.
