= Highclere Park =

Protected area in Hampshire, England

Coordinates: 51.339°N 1.350°W

- Site of Special Scientific Interest
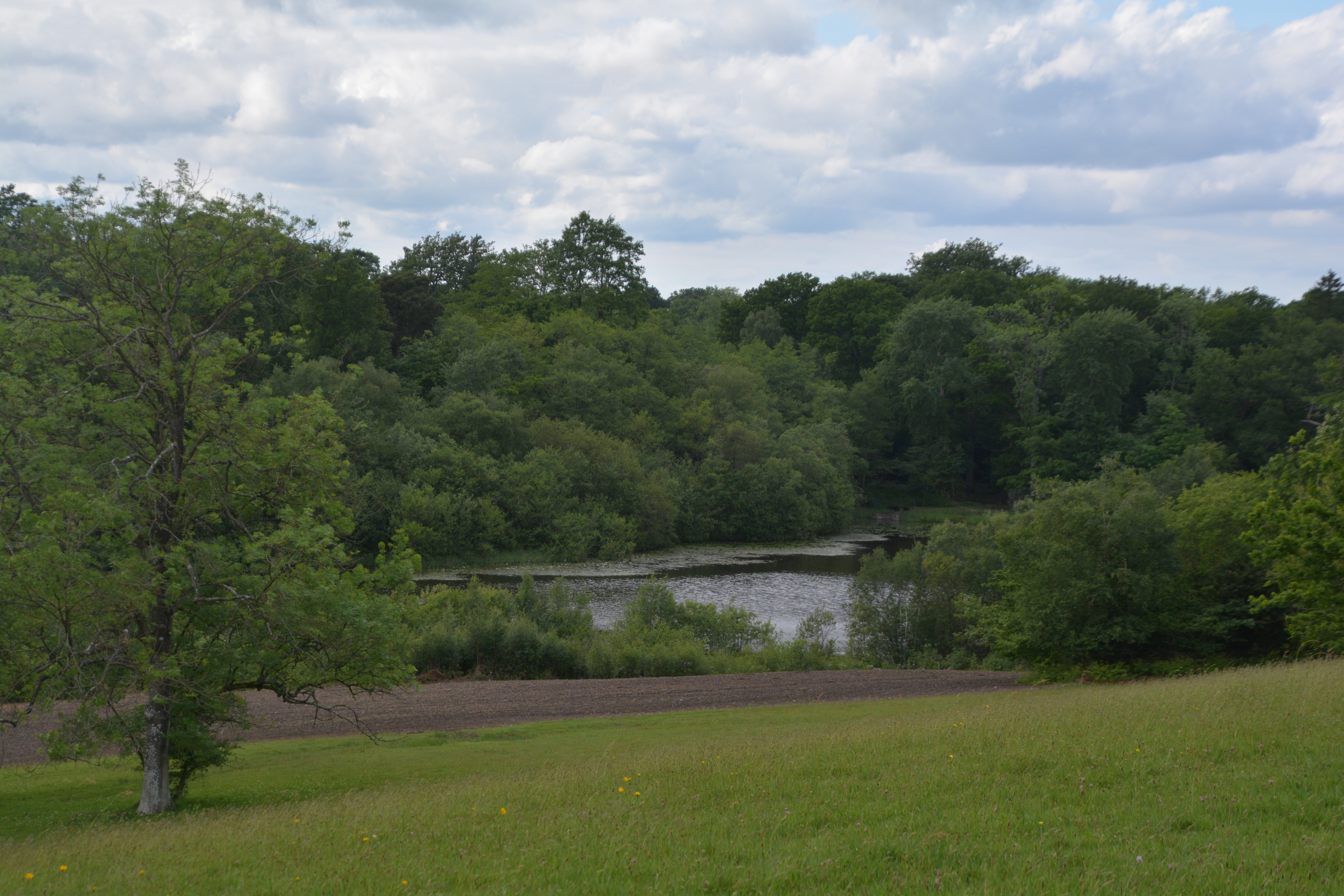
- Location of Highclere Park.
- Area of search: Hampshire
- Grid reference: SU 454 602
- Interest: Biological
- Area: 69.6 hectares (172 acres)
- Notification date: 1991
- Location map: Magic Map

Highclere Park is a 69.6-hectare (172-acre) biological Site of Special Scientific Interest east of Highclere in Hampshire. It is the park of Highclere Castle and is Grade 1 on the Register of Historic Parks and Gardens of Special Historic Interest in England.

This is the earliest documented estate in the county, recorded in 749, and it was landscaped by Capability Brown in around 1770. The mature trees have a rich and diverse lichen and moss flora, with many species typical of ancient woodland. There are two lakes, which were originally fishponds of the Bishop of Winchester, and they are bordered by areas of swamp and fen. There are also areas of grassland and the site is notable for its rich invertebrate populations.
