= Valley Gardens =

Woodland garden in Surrey, England

Coordinates: 51.4173°N 0.6044°W

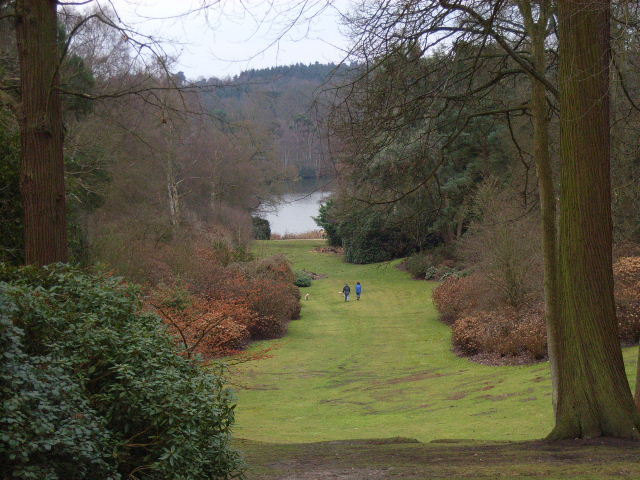
The view from the Plunket Memorial at the top of the Main Valley down to Virginia Water

The Valley Gardens are 220 acres (0.89 km^{2}) of woodland garden, part of the Crown Estate located near Englefield Green in the English county of Surrey, on the eastern edge of Windsor Great Park. The Valley Gardens and the nearby Savill Gardens are Grade I listed on the Register of Historic Parks and Gardens.

== Plants ==
They contain unrivalled collections of azaleas, camellias, magnolias and many other spring-flowering shrubs and trees. There are several acres of daffodils. A heather garden of 10 acres (40,000 m^{2}) gives pleasure even in winter.

== History ==
The gardens were planted from 1946 onwards by King George VI and Queen Elizabeth. It was J.B. Stevenson of Tower Court who urged the selection of the Kurume azaleas for the Punch Bowl and it was his famous collection of rhododendrons which was added to the Gardens in the 1940s after his death. The work was undertaken at a time of great austerity. Contemporary publicity noted that the gardens "open to the public would provide pleasant hours of relaxation for many a tired worker from factory or office". They were and should remain "private gardens accessible to the public".

== Proposed developments ==
As the Valley Gardens entered the 21st century, the Crown Estate were proposing to fence Valley Gardens with a 1.7 metre steel deer fence and charge for entry. Many residents from Berkshire and Surrey and all the parishes around Windsor Great Park opposed this scheme. They were joined by a nationwide and international protest from all those who know and love the gardens as a magnificent and unique woodland landscape. The Valley Gardens Action Group were formed to fight these proposals. After an intense campaign, the Crown Estate backed down and deferred these plans.

The Crown Estate will conduct "extended monitoring of horticultural and landscape management issues over the next few years. Other proposals ...such as the provision of a land train, children's adventure play area and closure of the Valley Gardens car park are also subject to further review".
