= Heckfield Place =

Country house in Heckfield, Hampshire, England

Coordinates: 51.3439°N 0.9504°W

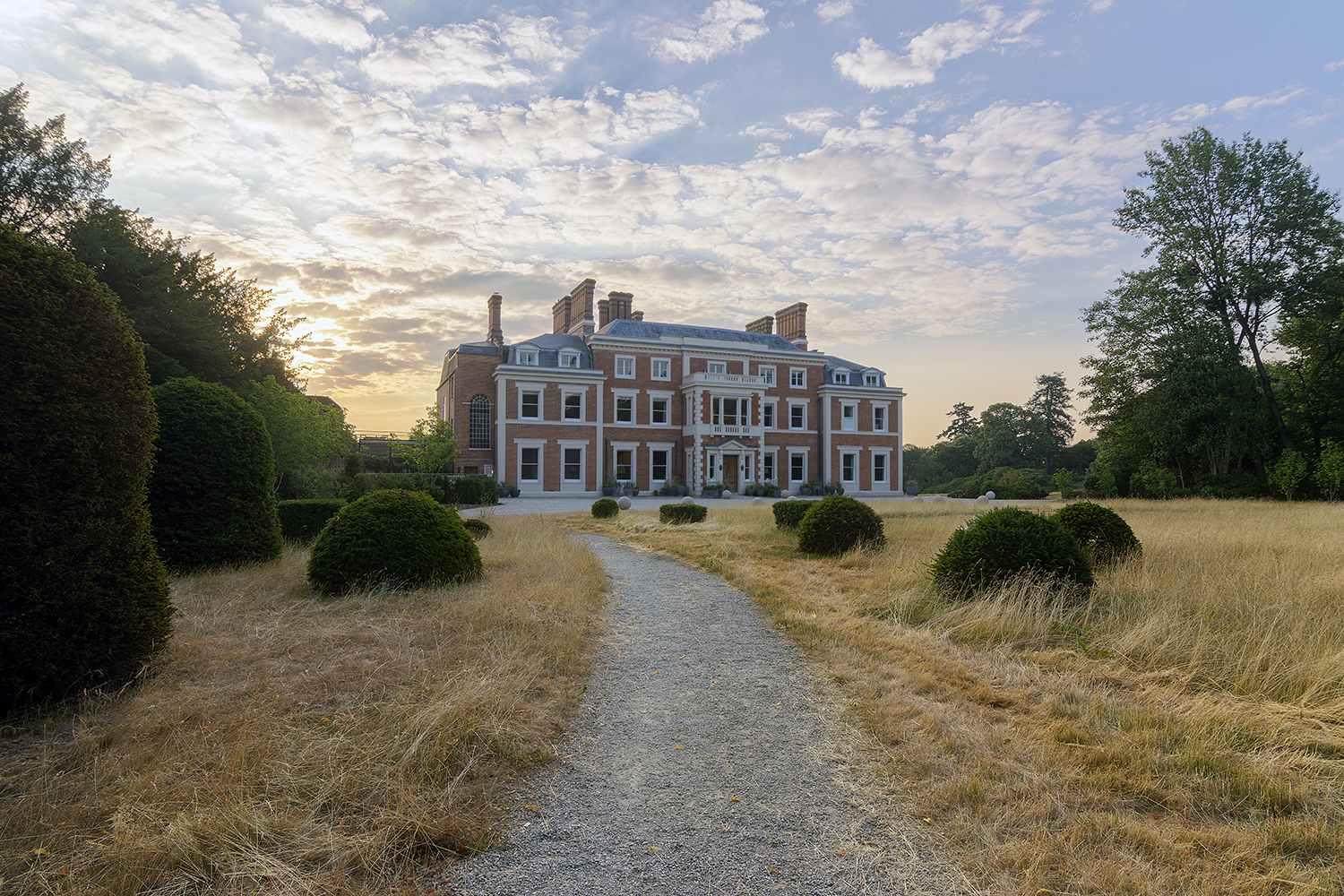
The house

The heart of Heckfield Place, a country estate of 438 acres, is a Georgian Grade II listed manor house, in Hampshire, United Kingdom. It was built between 1763 and 1766 for Jane Hawley (1744–1815), it was enlarged by the Shaw Lefevre family, who lived in the estate from 1786 to 1895. In the 20th century, it was owned by the family of Col Horace Walpole before being sold to Racal Electronics plc. and converted to a conference and training centre in 1981–1982.

An additional wing was added to the north of the manor house, extending into the walled garden. From 2000 to 2002, Heckfield Place was run as a corporate training centre by the Thales Group. The building underwent major refurbishment from 2009 until 2018, when it opened as a luxury country house hotel and wonThe Sunday Times’ Hotel of the Year Award.

== Original house and Jane Hawley ==
Jane Hawley (1744–1815), the elder daughter of Revd John Baker of Ilton, Somerset (1713–1757), began the construction of the five-bay core of Heckfield Place manor house after the death of her husband, William Hawley of West Green House, Mattingley around August 1763. Jane had been orphaned (1757) and married (still a minor, in 1760), and become a mother (1761) and then a widow (1763) all in around six years, and she was still not yet twenty years old.

She borrowed against the funds left in trust for her infant son Henry, and used some of the money to build herself a new house and amass a small estate. The choice of the site for Heckfield Place appears to have been influenced by the proximity of her uncle and guardian, William Baker (1716–1800) and aunt Sarah with whom lived Jane's younger sister Catherine, at a house called The Grove (part of the Stratfield Saye estate of George Pitt), on Heckfield Heath. The site was also high, pleasant, and healthy, and afforded magnificent views to the north-east towards Windsor.

The architect of the house is not known. It was brick-built, three-storey (with a stone staircase), of five bays, with five rooms on the ground floor. To make the most of the views down a small valley, the garden front faced east, and the main entrance was on the west front. Late 18th-century maps suggest three outbuildings to the north and north-west. These included 'a double coach-house, and good stabling for ten horses.' Advertisements for the letting of West Green, in July 1766 suggest that Heckfield Place was completed by this date.

In 1768 Jane married for a second time. Her husband was Revd. Mountague Rush (1731–1785), younger son of Sir John Rush of Streatley, a former High Sheriff of Berkshire. Jane had another nine (eight surviving) children. Rush was, from 1774, the rector of the neighbouring parish of Elvetham. Revd Rush died in February 1785, an event which triggered the sale of Heckfield Place. Contemporary sale notices confirm that the Heckfield Place estate, by this date, stretched to about 120 acres.

== The Shaw Lefevres ==
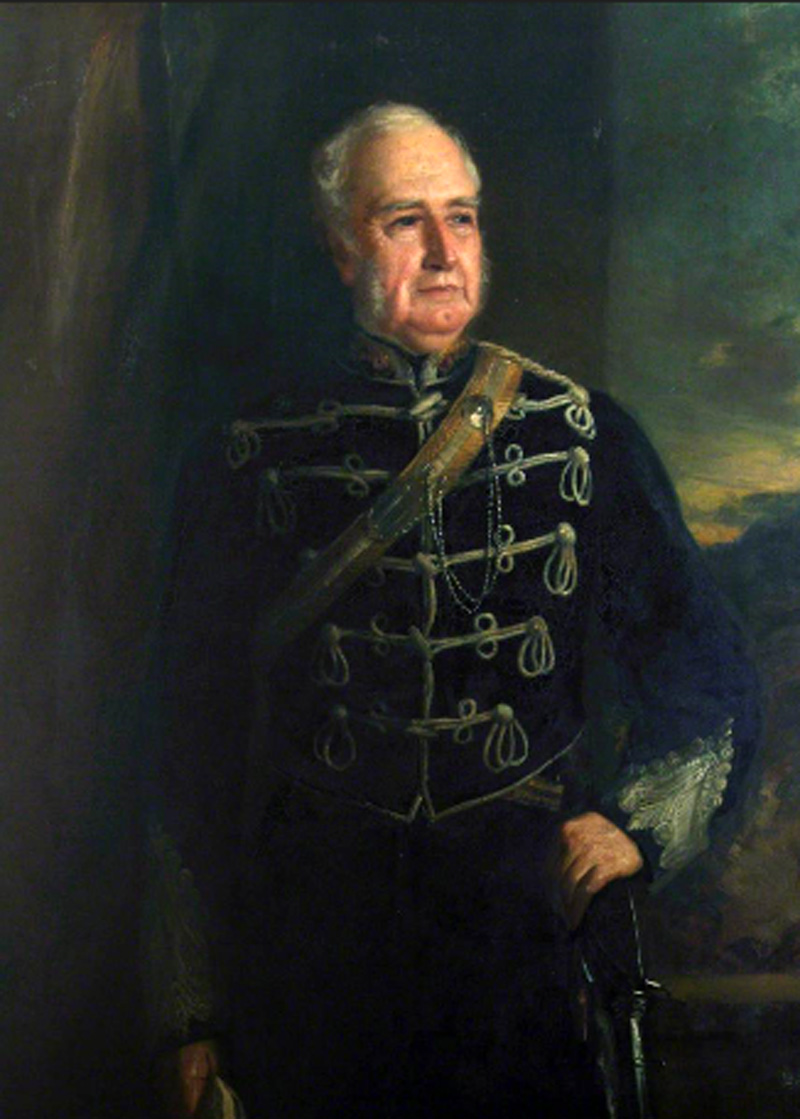
Charles Shaw Lefevre, Viscount Eversley

John Lefevre (1721/2-1790) of a successful Huguenot family of textile dyers, gin distillers and bankers established around Spitalfields and Stratford, East London, bought Heckfield Place in February 1786. He and his wife Helena (née Selman, d 1816) had an only daughter, also Helena, who in 1789 was married to Charles Shaw (1759–1823). John Lefevre died early the following year. Shaw, a graduate of Trinity College, Cambridge, was of Yorkshire origin, his father, George Shaw, having been the rector of Kirk Smeaton. As a condition of marriage (and inheritance) Charles added the name 'Lefevre' to his own.

Charles Shaw Lefevre became MP for Newtown (Isle of Wight, 1796–1802) and for Reading (1802–1820), was the Recorder for Basingstoke, and in the 1790s, raised a company of militia in North Hampshire. After the death of John Lefevre's widow in 1816, the Shaw Lefevres enlarged the Rush house by the addition of identical wings to the north and south. Servants' quarters, walled gardens, an ice house, stables and coach houses were also built, and the upper lake created. The Grove (possibly used as their home while the works were on-going) appears to have been demolished by 1818.

By 1790, Shaw Lefevre had also acquired the present-day Home Farm acreage. Through land exchanges with neighbours (particularly Pitt and afterwards, the Dukes of Wellington), by purchase and through enclosure, Shaw Lefevre and his son greatly enlarged the estate, particularly to the south, until it extended to 2,388 acres.

The Shaw Lefevres had four (three surviving) sons: Charles (later Viscount Eversley 1794–1888), John (1797–1879, Clerk of the Parliaments) and Henry (1802–1880, banker). Charles married in 1817 Emma Laura Whitbread (1798–1857) youngest daughter of the leading Whig politician Samuel Whitbread II. They had six children, three daughters who survived to adulthood, and three sons, all of whom died. Charles Shaw Lefevre senior suffered badly with gout, and died in 1823. His widow, Helena, died in France in 1834.

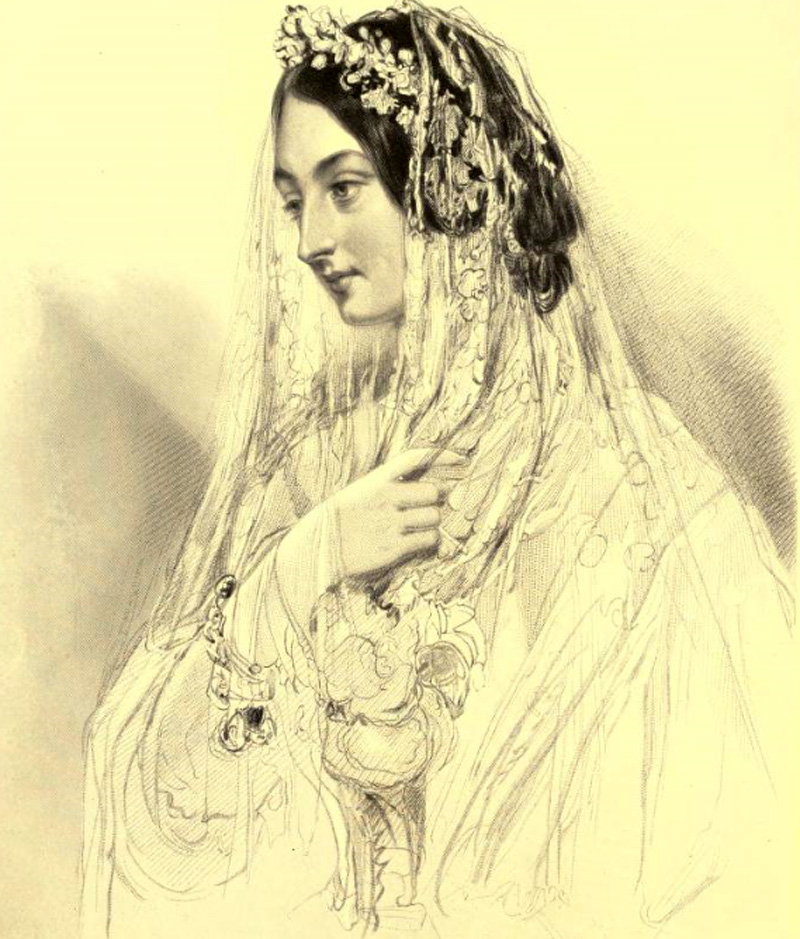
Helena Shaw Lefevre later Lady St. John Mildmay on her wedding day in 1851.

The younger Charles Shaw Lefevre inherited from his father and entered Parliament as the (Whig) Member for Downton, Isle of Wight, in 1830. After the Reform of Parliament, he became the MP for North Hampshire to which he was returned unopposed from 1832 until his retirement in 1857. He showed an interest mainly in agricultural affairs, particularly the heated topic of corn prices, and he chaired a Commission on Agricultural Depression 1835–36.

Charles and Emma Shaw Lefevre undertook two further phases of work to the manor house: by 1840 square bay windows had been added to the east and west fronts, and outside, a formal Italianate balustraded terrace had been wrapped around the east and south fronts; by the 1850s, the whole of the south-east corner of the house had been thrown out to create a fine library (a scheme that possibly involved Edward Blore, whose diaries record visits to Heckfield Place in December and January 1846–47). Probably at the same time, French windows were inserted into the south front, giving direct access to the garden from the drawing room. Sicilian marble columns and fireplaces were added in the public rooms, the cast-iron firebacks displaying the quartered arms of Shaw Lefevre and Whitbread.

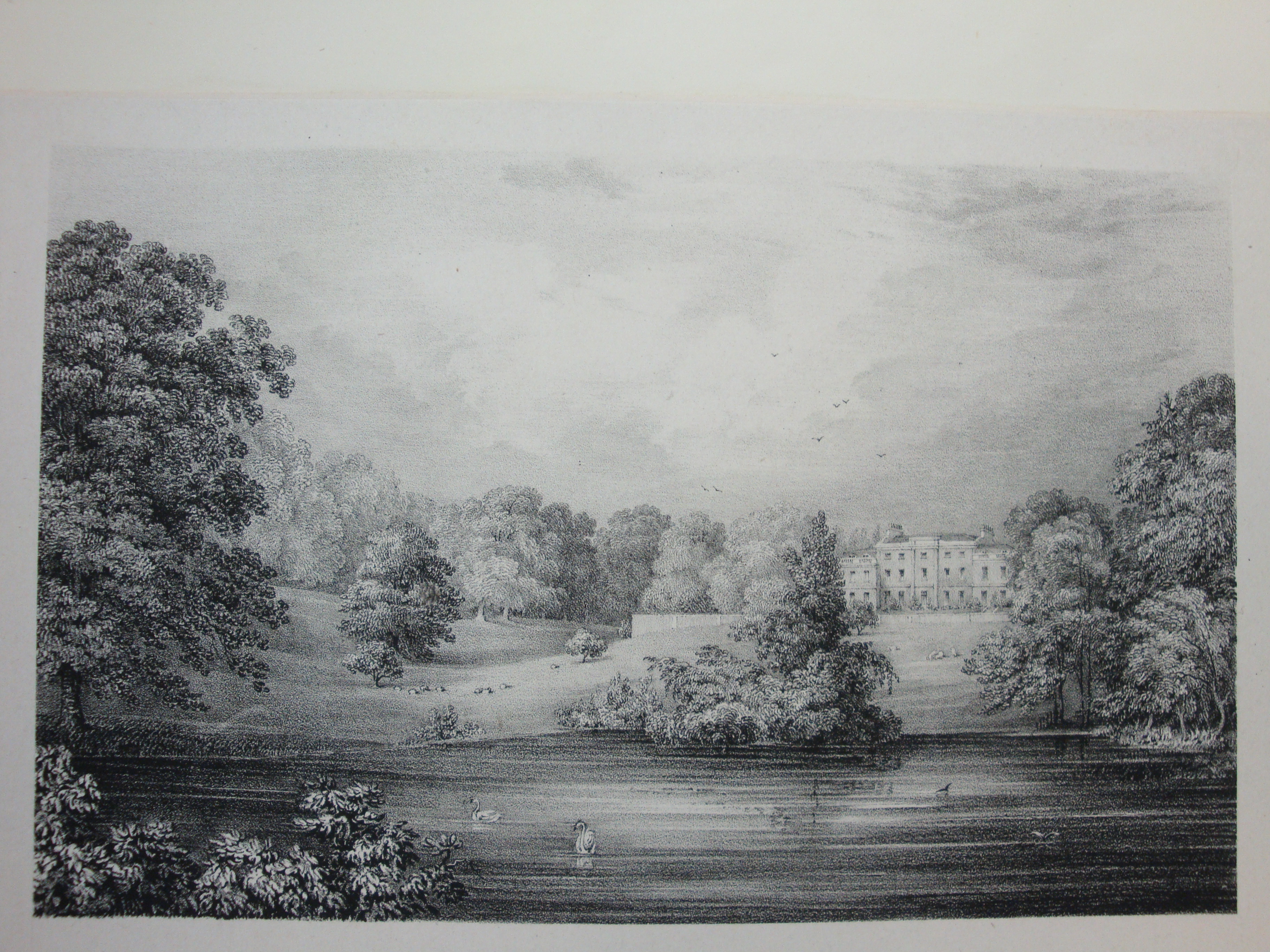
1830s engraving of the East Front over the Upper Lake from Hampshire Vol II, by Robert Mudie (Winchester, 1838)

At the north end of the terrace, a conservatory was added, perpendicular to the house. Inserted into the terrace on the east side were steps giving access to the Pinetum and shrubberies, begun in the mid-1850s. A second lake was excavated below the first, with a waterfall, island and boat house.

In May 1839 Shaw Lefevre was elected Speaker of the House of Commons under the Whig government of Lord Melbourne. After the dissolution of Parliament in 1841, he retained the post – the first Speaker to do so after a change of governing party. Sir Robert Peel (with Shaw Lefevre, a co-founder of the Agricultural Society of England in 1838) assured Shaw Lefevre that 'my own vote will be given with great satisfaction in favour of your Re-election as Speaker.' This is how Shaw Lefevre was able to 'establish a powerful tradition of political neutrality for its future presiding officers to follow.'

As a director of Whitbread, it was also Shaw Lefevre who first used the dray horses of the firm's City brewery to draw the Speaker's Coach to State Openings of Parliament, a tradition maintained until Whitbread closed the Chiswell Street premises in 1976. He retained the post until he felt that his hearing was deteriorating, and retired in May 1857. Shaw Lefevre is the second-longest Speaker in the history of the Commons. Palmerston believed Shaw Lefevre to be 'the best who ever filled the chair.'

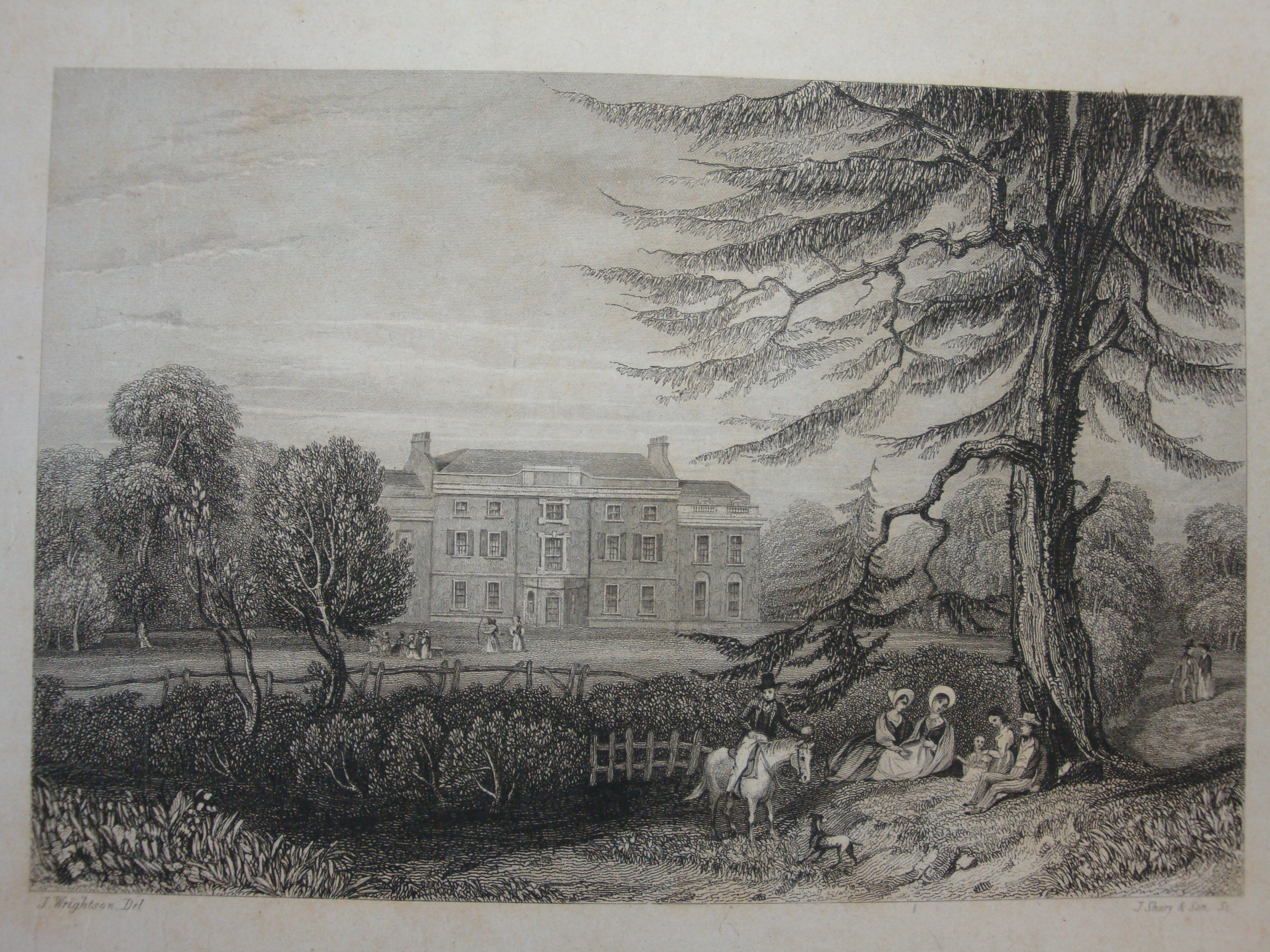
1830s engraving of the West Front from Hampshire Vol II, by Robert Mudie (Winchester, 1838)

Having no male heir, Shaw Lefevre negotiated a life peerage as Viscount Eversley and a pension of £4,000 per annum. Just as he was on the point of retirement, Shaw Lefevre was widowed; he survived his wife by thirty years. Two of their daughters married into the Mildmay family, Helena living at the nearby Dogmersfield estate; their eldest daughter, Emma Laura, did not marry and was chatelaine of Heckfield Place in her father's retirement.

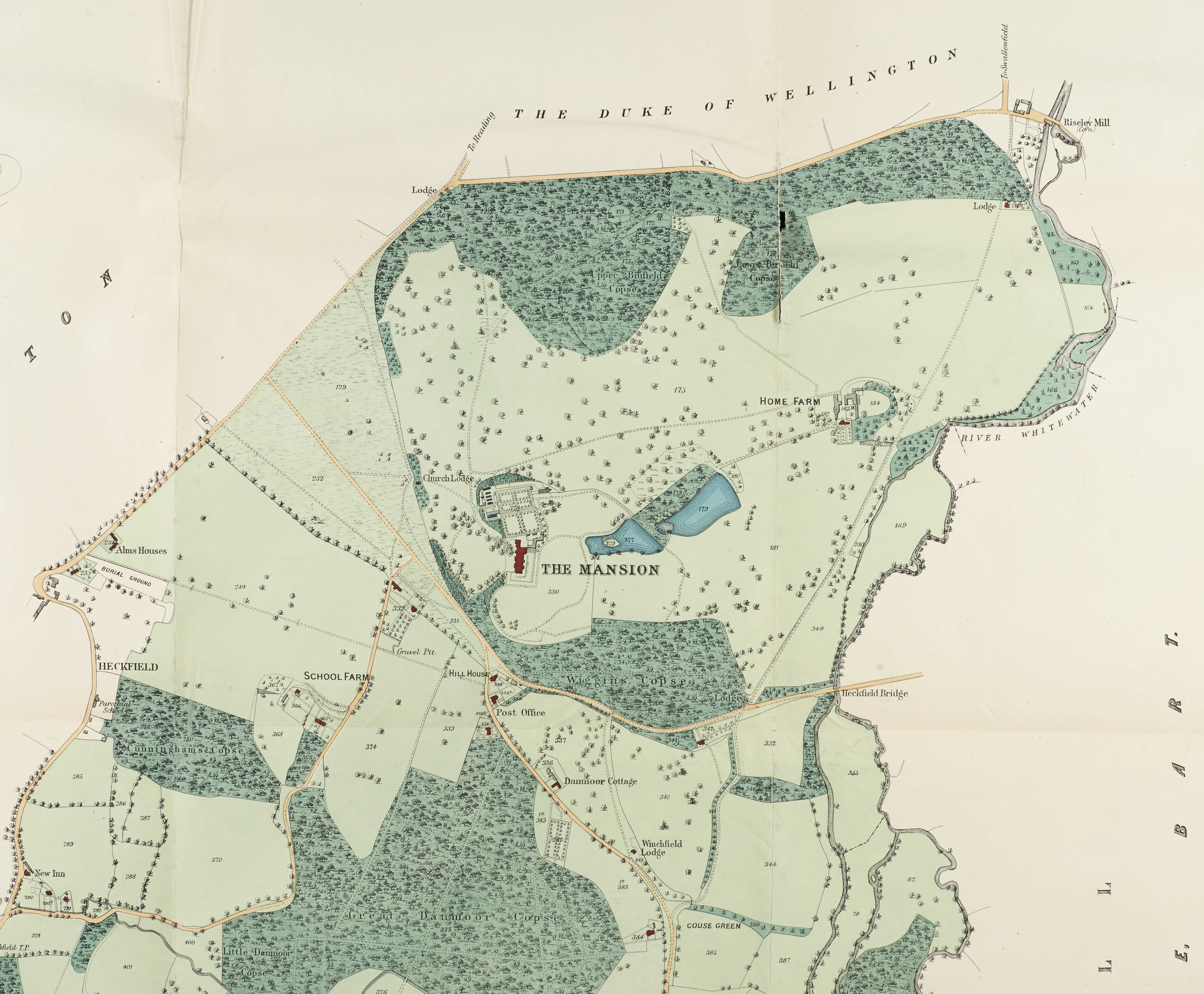
1895 sales particulars map – Hampshire Record Office: 38M49/7/191

During these decades, Lord Eversley's chief pleasures were his gardens and his game. Lord Eversley's Head Gardener from 1865 was William Wildsmith (1837–1890). Wildsmith became one of the foremost men of his profession, leading the contemporary development of carpet bedding (for which the terrace at Heckfield Place was famous) from over-fussy floral patterns of annuals into looser, hardy, year-round planting. Wildsmith sat on fruit committees at Kew Gardens, wrote columns for contemporary journals and contributed a chapter on summer bedding to William Robinson's English Flower Garden. He also won for Heckfield Place a reputation as a top training ground for outstanding gardeners.

At Heckfield Place, Wildsmith extended sub-tropical planting around the lower lake; the pinetum flourished in the native heathland soil, and included early sequoiadendron specimens; fifteen men tended the shrubberies; glass frames of every description enabled the unseasonal forcing of produce, for example of strawberries for the table in February; the walled gardens were legendary for fruit – for pears (the favourite fruit of Lord Eversley) and for grapes in particular. The grape room could preserve up to 2,000 bunches, enabling dessert grapes to be offered on the dining table every day of the year. The Heckfield Place garden was opened to the public, and in 1882 drew 2,000 visitors in five days. The Journal of Horticulture and Cottage Gardener that year described it as 'a model garden both in design and execution. Surpassed by none and equalled by few.'

Lord Eversley bought himself a new shotgun for his ninetieth birthday and the woods were developed to supply fine driven shooting. Under Head Keeper Mr Martin, on a single day in 1887, five guns between them bagged 580 pheasant, 4 partridge, 16 hares and 24 rabbits. Eversley's interest in agriculture was undiminished. He served as president of the Royal Agricultural Society of England in 1862 (the year after Prince Albert, who had died in office). A model home farm, today's Home Farm, was built at Heckfield Place, with a state-of-the-art dairy to supply the manor house. Lord Eversley invested in subsoil draining on estate farms and enjoyed livestock breeding. His Smithfield Show entry of 1851, an 'improved Heckfield Pig' was described simply as 'astonishing'.

Heckfield Place remained a focus for the wider Shaw Lefevre family until Lord Eversley died, aged 94, on 28 December 1888. His daughter remained at Heckfield Place for a few years, but the Trustees put the estate up for sale in 1895.

== The Walpole family ==
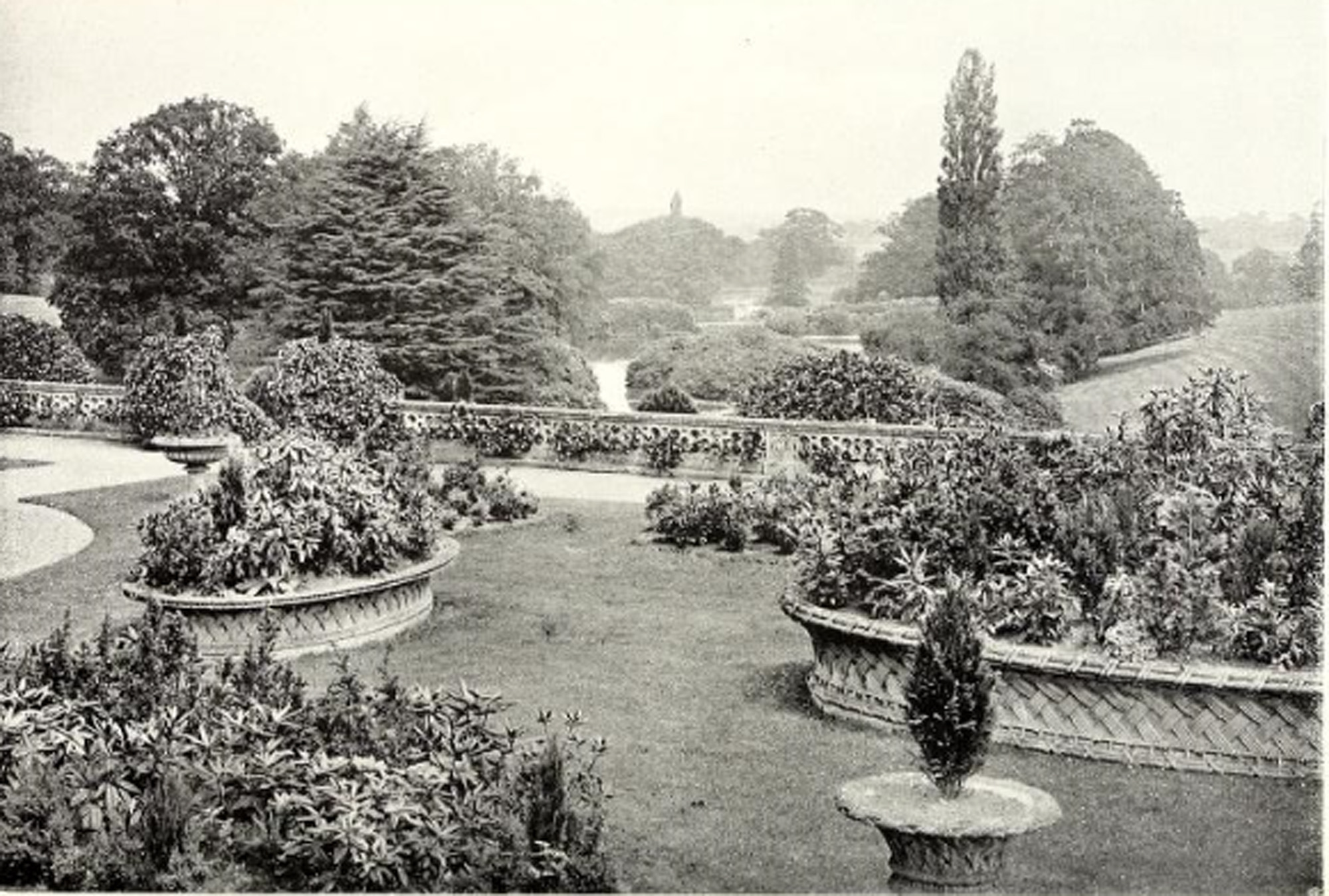
Terrace Garden 1900

Colonel Horace Walpole (1849–1919) bought the Heckfield Place estate by private treaty in July 1895. Walpole was a four-times great-nephew of the Prime Minister, Sir Robert Walpole, but the illegitimate son of the 4th Earl of Orford as a result of his affair with Lady Susan Hamilton. As such, Col Walpole was barred from inheriting the title, but on his father's death, in December 1894, he inherited considerable wealth and personal effects, enabling him to buy Heckfield Place. Improvements were made by Col Walpole to the house, including the installation of electricity, redigging the drains, and the building of a brick tower near the walled gardens, to distribute water pumped from a nearby spring, to the house, cottages and gardens.

Walpole and his wife Pauline (née Langdale, 1858–1944) had two daughters, Dorothy and Maude. Until the outbreak of war in 1914, life at Heckfield Place continued much as it had, the seasons punctuated by open gardens, shooting days, horse-racing and fox-hunting. The Walpoles were a Catholic family, and the contents of Heckfield Place included an extraordinary collection of Stuart portraits. Lord Eversley's erstwhile conservatory was converted to a chapel, with a priest from Douai Abbey leading mass on Sundays, alternately with neighbouring Bramshill House.

When Walpole died in 1919 he left the house to his eldest daughter Dorothy (1895–1977). The same year she married Major Austin Scott Murray (1881–1943); they had one daughter, Anne. Dorothy Scott Murray steered Heckfield Place through the difficult years of the twentieth century. She sold a large proportion of the estate (including, in 1920 about 1300 acres around Mattingley) and many family artefacts.

Major Scott Murray died in 1943 and two years later Dorothy married Colonel Colin Kayser Davy (1896–1971). In the 1950s and 1960s Dorothy Davy sold off Walpole family pictures, books, manuscripts, miniatures, and silver. The management of the gardens was simplified, it being written of Dorothy that 'If you want to find the lady of the manor in winter she will be in some bush with a billhook; in summer pursuing her little motor mower along the paths. You'll find her with no difficulty, for as soon as you get anywhere near the dogs will come rushing and bawling blue murder.' Dorothy lived at Heckfield Place until her death in 1977 after which the estate passed to her daughter's family and was sold.

== Conference and training centre ==
Heckfield Place and sixty-seven acres were bought by Patrick Hungerford and Toby Ward in 1981 and converted to a training and conference facility, acquired by Racal Electronics the following year.

Racal's customers, particularly military radio users, attended training at Heckfield Place through the 1980s, resulting in an eclectic mix of international guests.

In the mid-1980s, Racal began the move into cellular radio, launching Vodafone in January 1985 after selling off much of Racal to Thales (formerly Thomson CSF).

Heckfield Place now became essentially a Vodafone staff training centre. Racal sold Vodafone in 1991 and in late 2000 Racal itself was bought for £1,300m by Thales. The house was run as Thales Commercial University until its sale to the current owner in 2002.

== Heckfield Place as it is today ==
From 2009 the manor house underwent extensive renovation prior to opening in September 2018 as a hotel with restaurants, a spa and screening room. The 220 acres of pleasure grounds, former site of The Grove, and the 180-acre Home Farm form a consolidated landholding, fringed by its own woodland, and by fishing on the River Whitewater. With a tagline of 'Calling all Curious Minds,’ a programme of varied events, including workshops, screenings and talks, known as The Assembly, is staged at the property.

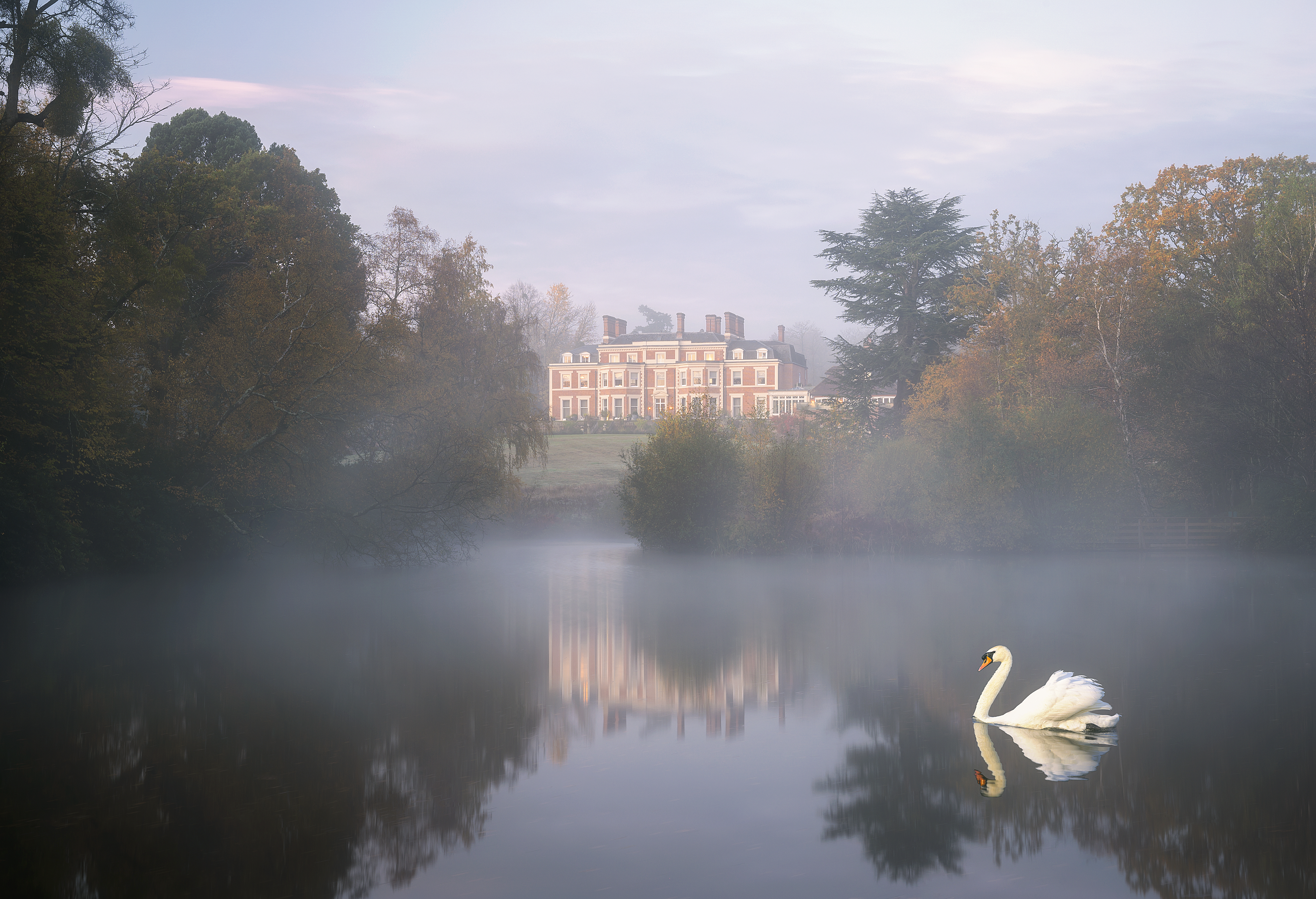
The east front seen over the Upper Lake

If the House is the heart of Heckfield, the certified-organic farm is its soul. In the process of achieving biodynamic status at the end of 2020, the farm provides much for the House: from flowers to rotating arable crops and honey.

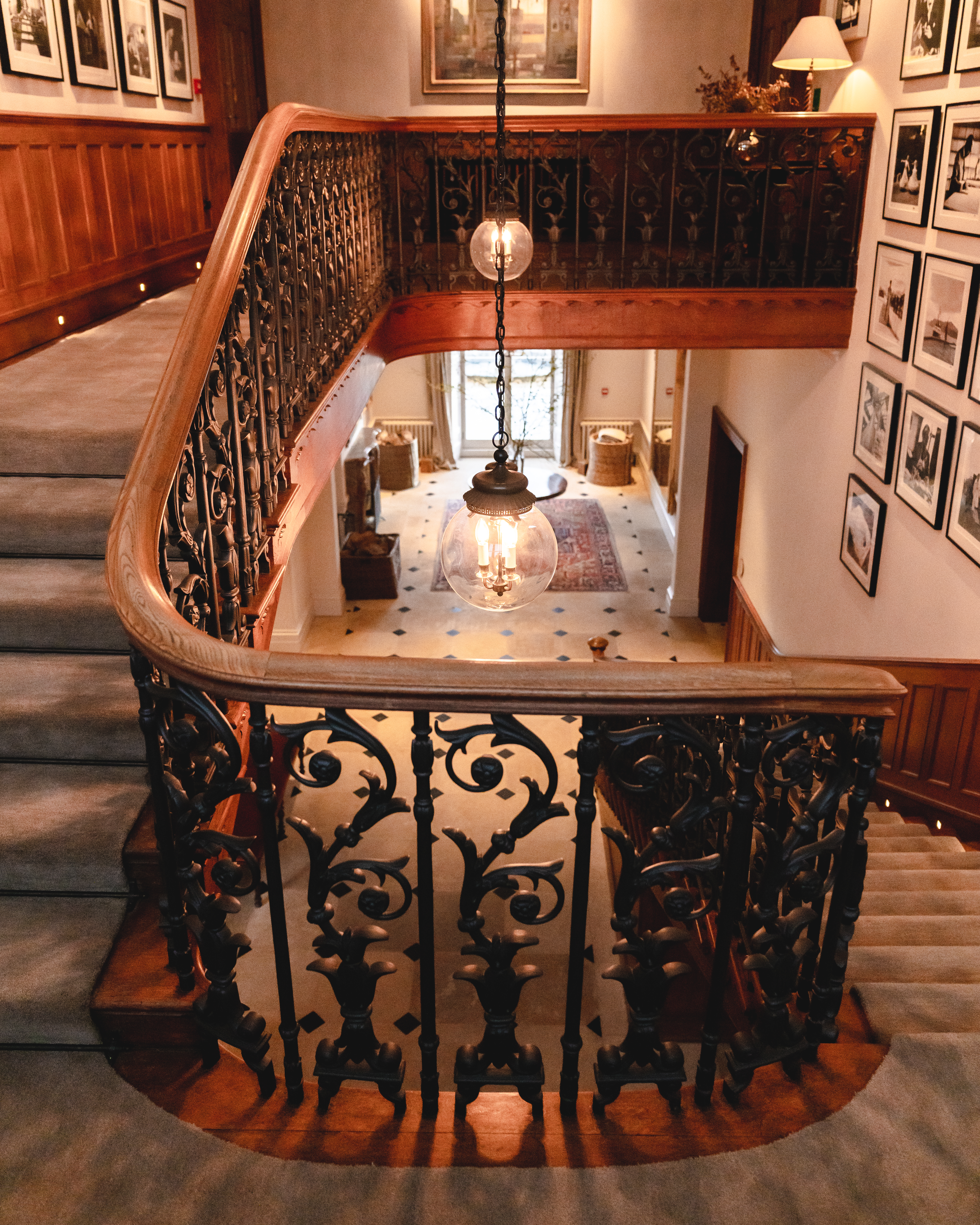
Heckfield Place hall

In 2020 Heckfield Place opened its own micro-dairy, which generates raw milks, cream, butter and yogurts for the House. The milk from its 38 Guernsey cows is creating cheese with local cheesemaker Village Maid and there are 59 Suffolk as well as Hampshire and Southdown sheep. In terms of pigs, there are also 35 British saddlebacks – the closest match to the original Heckfield pig mentioned in the Spectator in 1850 bred by Lord Eversley – which supply the manor house and restaurants (called Marle and open-fired Hearth). They help control the grass and bring fertility to the soil, a vital part of the biodynamic closed circle.

The farm also has two flocks of 400 free-range Hyline chickens roaming the farm and providing eggs for the Kitchens, while 20 beehives buzz around the 500-strong orchard, where the blossoms of apple, pear, greengages, damsons, cherries, medlars and more help them create delicious honeycomb for the table.

Seven new glasshouses each set to different temperatures propagate everything that goes into the cut garden, nurturing lettuces, soft fruits, brassicas, squash and a variety of species of tomatoes, as well as providing for year-round fresh flowers including narcissi, tulips, ranunculi, roses, delphiniums, grasses, berries, and various edible blossoms surrounded by a living hedge of hawthorns, mulberries and blackberries. Everything grown on the farm forms the basis of the root-to-plate feasts served the table and the floral arrangements throughout the Estate.

Skye Gyngell served as Culinary Director of Heckfield Place from 2018 to 2025. She was succeeded by Eleanor Henson, who continues Gyngell’s culinary vision.
