= Hatch Park =

Nature reserve near Mersham, Kent, England

Coordinates: 51.129°N 0.946°E

- Site of Special Scientific Interest
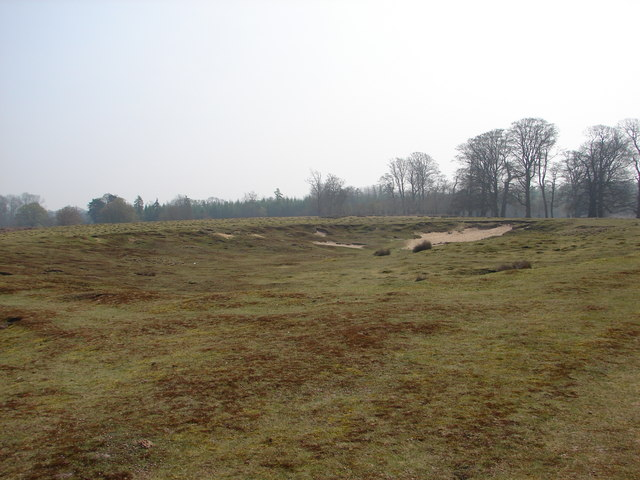
- Location of Hatch Park.
- Area of search: Kent
- Grid reference: TR 062 408
- Interest: Biological
- Area: 71.8 hectares (177 acres)
- Notification date: 1986
- Location map: Magic Map

Hatch Park is a 71.8-hectare (177-acre) biological Site of Special Scientific Interest east of Ashford in Kent. It is listed by Historic England on the Register of Historic Parks and Gardens of Special Historic Interest in England.

This site has species-rich acidic grassland which is the remnant of a larger deer park, and is still managed by a herd of deer. There are also ancient pollard woods which are the richest for epiphytic lichens in the county. Several ponds have adjacent areas of marsh.

The site is private land which is not open to the public.
