= Herschel Park =

Park in Slough, Berkshire, England

Coordinates: 51°30′06″N 0°35′36″W

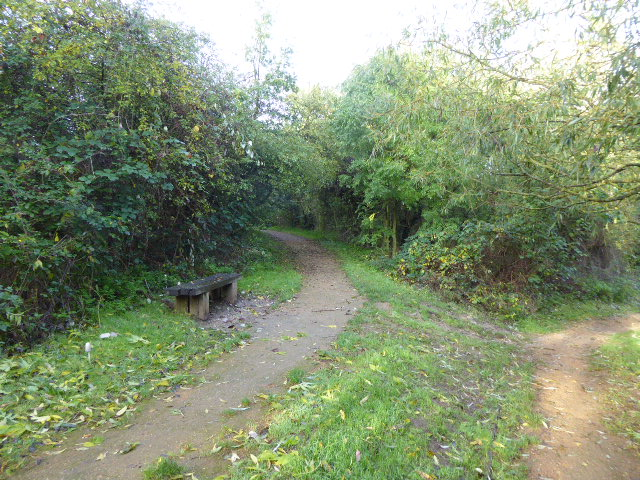
- Interactive map of Herschel Park
- Type: Local Nature Reserve
- Location: Slough, Berkshire
- OS grid: SU 977 790
- Area: 4.2 hectares (10 acres)
- Manager: Slough Borough Council

Herschel Park is a public park in Upton, a suburb of Slough in Berkshire. It is owned and managed by Slough Borough Council. It is in two adjacent areas. The larger area of 4.2-hectare (10-acre) in the north is a Local Nature Reserve. The more formal area in the north is a Grade II listed park.

== Geography and site ==
The parkland has two lakes and ponds. The larger lake features an island planted with mature trees. The park also features a set of mature specimen and ornamental trees.

== History ==
The park has been in existence from at least 1843, when James Bedborough bought the land in the area and used it to build twenty-nine terraced houses and large villas that looked out over the park. It is believed that Sir Joseph Paxton laid out the original park grounds. The park when opened was called Upton Park.

In 1949, the park was sold to Slough Borough Council. In 1952 the council changed its name from Upton Park Pleasure Grounds to Herschel Park, after the astronomer Sir William Herschel. In 1962–63, Slough Corporation purchased a further 10 acres from Eton College, which by 1982 had become part of Herschel Park.

In 2000, the water in the lakes suddenly disappeared, and a group was set up called Friends of Herschel Park, who together with Slough Borough Council started to apply for funds to return the park to its original Victorian design. In January 2009 the park was granted £2.7 million of council and lottery funding by the Heritage Lottery Fund. In 2011 work was finished; the lakes were refilled with water, and the original paths were restored.

In 2013, the site was declared as a local nature reserve by Slough Borough Council.

== Fauna ==
The site has the following fauna:

=== Mammals ===
- European rabbit
- Eastern gray squirrel
- Reeves's muntjac
- Red fox
- Common pipistrelle
- Field vole

=== Invertebrates ===
- Gerridae
- Comma butterfly
- Araneus diadematus
- Stag beetle
- Six-spot burnet
- Chorthippus parallelus
- Meadow brown
- Libellula depressa

=== Birds ===
- European green woodpecker
- Mandarin duck
- Mallard
- Canada goose
- Common blackbird
- Eurasian blue tit
- European robin
- Cetti's warbler
- Common kestrel
- Moorhen
- Egyptian goose
- Great spotted woodpecker
- Song thrush

=== Amphibians & reptiles ===
- Common frog
- Anguis fragilis

== Flora ==
The site has the following flora:

=== Trees ===
- Fraxinus excelsior
- Cedrus deodara
- Aesculus hippocastanum
- Taxodium distichum
- Quercus robur
- Quercus ilex
- Lucombe oak
- Turkey oak
- Araucaria araucana
- Taxus baccata
- Ilex aquifolium

=== Plants ===
- Galanthus nivalis
- Myosotis
- Papaver rhoeas
- Leucanthemum vulgare
- Lotus corniculatus
- Centaurea nigra
- Mentha aquatica
- Lychnis flos-cuculi
- Caltha palustris
