= William Harvey (department store) =

Former department store in Guildford

William Harvey was a department store located in Guildford, Surrey, England.

== History ==
The William Harvey department store had its origins in a tailor's shop established in Guildford in 1725. By 1886, it was located at 126-127 High Street and John Cable was the proprietor. In January 1897, it amalgamated with a firm owned by John Reeks in the neighbouring premises and the combined business was known as "Cable, Reeks and Co.". A fire destroyed the store and severely damaged neighbouring shops in November 1915. Temporary premises were rented at the Old Corn Exchange (Tunsgate).

William Harvey (who later served as Mayor of Guildford from 1932-1934) was born in Ashford, Kent in 1883 and moved to Guildford in 1911, to join Cable, Reeks and Co. By 1915, he was a partner in the business. During the First World War, he was a motorcycle dispatch rider and was awarded the Military Medal for bravery. He returned to Guildford in 1919 and took over the ladieswear department of the company.

Harvey bought Cable, Reeks and Co. in 1922 and developed the business into a department store with a slant on fashion. In 1946 the business was incorporated and two years later moved into new premises opposite. However the move had put the company into financial problems, and in 1950 it was offered to Harrods who declined. In April 1951, it was put into voluntary liquidation, with a new company by the same name being set up to operate the store.

The new company did not stay independent for long, and in 1953 the expanding department store group Army & Navy purchased the business. The Guildford store was subsequently expanded by Army & Navy, who continued to operate William Harvey as a subsidiary, with five new floors and a roof garden. They also branded a new store located in Camberley Harveys, which opened in 1964.

House of Fraser purchased Army & Navy in 1973 and subsequently put in place a group system for its department stores. Army & Navy was designated the brand for its shops in southeast England and both the Guildford and Camberley branches had their names changed in 1974. The two shops, which had been rebranded again to House of Fraser, closed in 2023.
