= Grade II* listed buildings in Wealden =

Wealden shown within East Sussex

There are over 20,000 Grade II* listed buildings in England. This page is a list of these buildings in the district of Wealden in East Sussex.

== Wealden ==
Name	Location	Type	Completed (Note: The date given is the date used by Historic England as significant for the initial building or that of an important part in the structure's description.)	Date designated	Grid ref. (Note: The grid reference is based on the British national grid reference system, sometimes known as OSGB36, used by the Ordnance Survey.) Geo-coordinates	Entry number (Note: The "List Entry Number" is a unique number assigned to each listed building and scheduled monument by Historic England.)	Image
Court Farmhouse	Alciston, Wealden	Abbey	14th century to 15th century	13 October 1952	TQ5056205530; 50°49′47″N 0°08′12″E	1043356	Court Farmhouse More images
Ruins of Dovecote North West of Court House Farm	Alciston, Wealden	Dovecote	Medieval	13 October 1952	TQ5054205563; 50°49′48″N 0°08′11″E	1043357	Ruins of Dovecote North West of Court House Farm More images
The Old Clergy House	Alfriston, Wealden	Clergy House	14th century	13 October 1952	TQ5213102951; 50°48′22″N 0°09′28″E	1191431	The Old Clergy House More images
The Star Inn	Alfriston, Wealden	Public house	15th century	13 October 1952	TQ5203803116; 50°48′28″N 0°09′23″E	1353267	The Star Inn More images
Buxted Park	Buxted, Wealden	Hotel	c. 1722	26 November 1953	TQ4853722810; 50°59′08″N 0°06′53″E	1353483	Buxted Park More images
Courtyard with Terms, Balustrade and Fountain West Side of Buxted Park	Buxted, Wealden	Fountain	19th century	31 December 1982	TQ4850122859; 50°59′10″N 0°06′52″E	1028438	Courtyard with Terms, Balustrade and Fountain West Side of Buxted Park
Harrock House	Buxted, Wealden	House	Late 17th century	26 November 1953	TQ4895923569; 50°59′32″N 0°07′16″E	1028440	Upload Photo
Old Maypole Farmhouse	High Hurstwood, Buxted, Wealden	Farmhouse	15th century	26 November 1953	TQ4943125665; 51°00′39″N 0°07′43″E	1191063	Upload Photo
The Stables adjoining Buxted Park on the South West	Buxted, Wealden	House	After 1940	31 December 1982	TQ4846222791; 50°59′07″N 0°06′50″E	1353484	The Stables adjoining Buxted Park on the South West
Eckington House	Chalvington with Ripe, Wealden	Timber Framed House	Late 16th/early 17th century, or possibly older	13 October 1952	TQ5109410136; 50°52′16″N 0°08′46″E	1182750	Eckington House More images
Eckington Manor	Chalvington with Ripe, Wealden	Manor	Early 18th century	13 October 1952	TQ5128109953; 50°52′09″N 0°08′55″E	1353411	Eckington Manor More images
The Manor House	Chalvington with Ripe, Wealden	Manor House	Probably 16th century	13 October 1952	TQ5085110148; 50°52′16″N 0°08′33″E	1043089	The Manor House
The Old Cottage	Chalvington with Ripe, Wealden	Timber Framed House	Or earlier	13 October 1952	TQ5097910087; 50°52′14″N 0°08′40″E	1043093	The Old Cottage More images
Barn to the North-east of Place Farmhouse	Chiddingly, Wealden	Great House		30 August 1966	TQ5415214382; 50°54′30″N 0°11′28″E	1043303	Upload Photo
Place Farmhouse	Chiddingly Village, Chiddingly, Wealden	Farmhouse	16th century	13 October 1952	TQ5413414369; 50°54′30″N 0°11′27″E	1192781	Place Farmhouse
Stone Hill	Chiddingly, Wealden	House	1912	13 October 1952	TQ5624215690; 50°55′10″N 0°13′17″E	1193017	Upload Photo
Charleston Manor	Westdean, Cuckmere Valley, Wealden	House	16th century	13 October 1952	TQ5208400650; 50°47′08″N 0°09′22″E	1353445	Charleston Manor More images
Two Barns to North East of Charleston Manor	Westdean, Cuckmere Valley, Wealden	Barn	Or earlier	30 August 1966	TQ5212700667; 50°47′08″N 0°09′24″E	1184424	Upload Photo
Colin Godman's Farmhouse	Danehill, Wealden	Farmhouse	16th century	26 November 1953	TQ4176227097; 51°01′33″N 0°01′12″E	1028455	Upload Photo
The Cottages to the North of Friston Place	East Dean and Friston, Wealden	Stable	1613-1664	30 August 1966	TV5484298880; 50°46′08″N 0°11′40″E	1286068	Upload Photo
The Dipperays and Gazebo	East Dean and Friston, Wealden	House	Late 18th century	13 October 1952	TV5564997870; 50°45′34″N 0°12′20″E	1353311	The Dipperays and Gazebo More images
Barn at Halland Park Farm to South West of the Farmhouse	Shortgate, East Hoathly with Halland, Wealden	Barn	17th century	30 August 1966	TQ5107915904; 50°55′22″N 0°08′53″E	1353376	Upload Photo
Belmont	East Hoathly with Halland, Wealden	Vicarage	18th century	30 August 1966	TQ5260416546; 50°55′41″N 0°10′12″E	1043255	Upload Photo
The Parish Church	East Hoathly with Halland, Wealden	Parish Church	15th century	30 August 1966	TQ5201516160; 50°55′30″N 0°09′42″E	1043285	The Parish Church More images
Clinton Lodge	Fletching, Wealden	House	Late 17th century	26 November 1953	TQ4290223707; 50°59′42″N 0°02′06″E	1191500	Upload Photo
Dale Hamme	Fletching, Wealden	Timber Framed House	15th century	26 November 1953	TQ4414024520; 51°00′07″N 0°03′10″E	1028419	Dale Hamme
Sheffield Mill	Fletching, Wealden	Watermill	Commissioned 1597-98	17 October 1990	TQ4156625766; 51°00′50″N 0°01′00″E	1353726	Upload Photo
The Sheffield Arms Hotel	Sheffield Park, Fletching, Wealden	Hotel	18th century	26 November 1953	TQ4115324890; 51°00′22″N 0°00′38″E	1028397	The Sheffield Arms Hotel More images
Ashdown House School	Forest Row, Wealden	Country House	c. 1790	26 November 1953	TQ4452535725; 51°06′09″N 0°03′46″E	1286907	Ashdown House School More images
Bower Farmhouse	Hammerwood, Forest Row, Wealden	Farmhouse	C15-16	26 November 1953	TQ4378139143; 51°08′01″N 0°03′13″E	1191737	Upload Photo
Church of St Stephen	Hammerwood, Forest Row, Wealden	Church	1880	31 December 1982	TQ439395; 51°08′12″N 0°03′21″E	1028406	Church of St Stephen More images
Homestall Lodge (Stoke Brunswick School)	Ashurst Wood, Forest Row, Wealden	House	1933	18 April 1973	TQ4218237479; 51°07′08″N 0°01′48″E	1191682	Homestall Lodge (Stoke Brunswick School) More images
Kidbrooke Park, Michael Hall - Rudolf Steiner School	Forest Row, Wealden	Country House	18th century	26 November 1953	TQ4186834404; 51°05′29″N 0°01′28″E	1028377	Kidbrooke Park, Michael Hall - Rudolf Steiner School More images
Stables to North of Kidbrooke Park	Forest Row, Wealden	Courtyard	18th century	26 November 1953	TQ4186034456; 51°05′31″N 0°01′28″E	1028378	Upload Photo
The Ruins of Brambletye House	Forest Row, Wealden	Country House	In the reign of James I	26 November 1953	TQ4173735413; 51°06′02″N 0°01′23″E	1353491	The Ruins of Brambletye House More images
Beckets	Framfield, Wealden	Timber Framed House	15th century	26 November 1953	TQ4953220344; 50°57′47″N 0°07′41″E	1353522	Beckets More images
Framfield Place	Framfield, Wealden	House	Early-mid 19th century	27 January 1978	TQ4936320420; 50°57′50″N 0°07′32″E	1028364	Upload Photo
Lightlands	Frant, Wealden	House	16th century	26 November 1953	TQ5967433369; 51°04′39″N 0°16′41″E	1192089	Upload Photo
The Dower House, Bayham Abbey	Frant, Wealden	House	Before 1752	18 March 1977	TQ6492936461; 51°06′13″N 0°21′16″E	1028367	The Dower House, Bayham Abbey More images
Shepherds Hill including Terracing, Steps, Gatepiers and Garden House	Blackboys, Hadlow Down, Wealden	Farmhouse	18th century	26 November 1953	TQ5154822217; 50°58′46″N 0°09′27″E	1028320	Upload Photo
The Old Manor House	Hailsham, Wealden	House	Older building	12 August 1981	TQ5920909366; 50°51′43″N 0°15′39″E	1043237	Upload Photo
The Old Vicarage	Hailsham, Wealden	House	18th century	30 August 1966	TQ5921309511; 50°51′47″N 0°15′40″E	1353328	The Old Vicarage More images
Bolebroke Castle	Hartfield, Wealden	Castle	16th century	26 November 1953	TQ4749537767; 51°07′13″N 0°06′22″E	1028285	Bolebroke Castle More images
Old Marks	Holtye, Hartfield, Wealden	House	c. 1600	14 April 1994	TQ4587139038; 51°07′55″N 0°05′00″E	1262177	Upload Photo
Sussex House Farmhouse	Cowden, Hartfield, Wealden	Timber Framed House	C15-C16	26 November 1953	TQ4704840076; 51°08′28″N 0°06′02″E	1028302	Upload Photo
Heathfield Park	Heathfield and Waldron, Wealden	Great House	1677	13 October 1952	TQ5992020963; 50°57′57″N 0°16′34″E	1194135	Heathfield Park More images
New Mill	Cross In Hand, Heathfield and Waldron, Wealden	Post mill	1806	13 October 1952	TQ5579021751; 50°58′27″N 0°13′03″E	1183064	New Mill More images
Possingworth Manor	Waldron, Heathfield and Waldron, Wealden	House	Early 17th century	13 October 1952	TQ5348220485; 50°57′48″N 0°11′03″E	1183094	Upload Photo
Tanners Manor	Lions Green, Heathfield and Waldron, Wealden	Manor House	Early 17th century	13 October 1952	TQ5612318330; 50°56′36″N 0°13′15″E	1183044	Upload Photo
The Gibraltar Tower, Heathfield Park	Heathfield and Waldron, Wealden	Tower	1792-3	30 August 1966	TQ5879021394; 50°58′12″N 0°15′37″E	1194199	The Gibraltar Tower, Heathfield Park More images
All Saints Church	Old Heathfield Village, Heathfield and Waldron, Wealden	Parish Church	13th century	30 August 1966	TQ5985620294; 50°57′36″N 0°16′29″E	1194397	All Saints Church More images
Broad Farmhouse	Hellingly, Wealden	House	1753	13 October 1952	TQ5769412502; 50°53′26″N 0°14′27″E	1043198	Broad Farmhouse More images
Carter's Corner Place Cowbeech	Cowbeech, Hellingly, Wealden	House	1602	13 October 1952	TQ6085912336; 50°53′17″N 0°17′08″E	1194627	Upload Photo
The Mill Building at the Old Water Mill	Hellingly, Wealden	Mill	Or earlier	13 October 1952	TQ5849612522; 50°53′26″N 0°15′08″E	1180390	The Mill Building at the Old Water Mill More images
Winkenhurst	Hellingly, Wealden	House	Early 19th century	30 August 1966	TQ5823814607; 50°54′33″N 0°14′58″E	1043196	Upload Photo
Buckwell Place	Herstmonceux, Wealden	House	1981	12 August 1981	TQ6265912008; 50°53′05″N 0°18′40″E	1043143	Buckwell Place More images
Court Horeham	Cowbeech, Herstmonceux, Wealden	Timber Framed House	Or earlier	30 August 1966	TQ6097215166; 50°54′49″N 0°17′19″E	1043176	Upload Photo
Cowbeech House	Cowbeech, Herstmonceux, Wealden	House	1731	30 August 1966	TQ6195714518; 50°54′27″N 0°18′08″E	1353335	Upload Photo
Herstmonceux Science Centre	Herstmonceux, Wealden	Workshop	1953-1958	26 March 2003	TQ6516010473; 50°52′13″N 0°20′45″E	1391813	Herstmonceux Science Centre More images
The Windmill	Windmill Hill, Herstmonceux, Wealden	Post Mill	c. 1814	13 October 1952	TQ6470612154; 50°53′07″N 0°20′25″E	1285093	The Windmill More images
Court Lodge	Hooe, Wealden	Lodge	17th century	13 October 1952	TQ6852508771; 50°51′14″N 0°23′34″E	1285042	Upload Photo
Isfield Place	Isfield, Wealden	House	Early 17th century	26 November 1953	TQ4463018458; 50°56′51″N 0°03′27″E	1192811	Upload Photo
Ruins of Laughton Place	Laughton, Wealden	Farmhouse	18th century	13 October 1952	TQ4834511425; 50°53′00″N 0°06′27″E	1043133	Ruins of Laughton Place More images
Central Building of Wootton Manor	Long Man, Wealden	Farmhouse	Mid 17th century	13 October 1952	TQ5654305193; 50°49′30″N 0°13′17″E	1043258	Central Building of Wootton Manor More images
Folkington Manor	Folkington, Long Man, Wealden	House	1843	10 December 1973	TQ5612304062; 50°48′54″N 0°12′53″E	1043257	Folkington Manor More images
Chequers Hotel	Maresfield, Wealden	Hotel	18th century	26 November 1953	TQ4662224039; 50°59′49″N 0°05′17″E	1193093	Chequers Hotel More images
Marshalls Manor	Maresfield, Wealden	House	16th century	26 November 1953	TQ4521225019; 51°00′22″N 0°04′06″E	1028223	Marshalls Manor More images
Nutley Windmill	Nutley, Maresfield, Wealden	Post Mill	c. 1680	18 April 1973	TQ4509929082; 51°02′34″N 0°04′06″E	1353574	Nutley Windmill More images
The Shelly Arms Hotel	Nutley, Maresfield, Wealden	Hotel	18th century	26 November 1953	TQ4422528085; 51°02′03″N 0°03′20″E	1353573	The Shelly Arms Hotel
Argos Hill Windmill	Argos Hill, Mayfield and Five Ashes, Wealden	Post Mill	Unknown	26 November 1953	TQ5702028298; 51°01′57″N 0°14′17″E	1353580	Argos Hill Windmill More images
Stone House	Mayfield and Five Ashes, Wealden	Guest House	18th century	26 November 1953	TQ5871327018; 51°01′14″N 0°15′42″E	1028179	Upload Photo
Walnut Tree House	Mayfield and Five Ashes, Wealden	House	16th century	26 November 1953	TQ5873026989; 51°01′13″N 0°15′42″E	1193529	Upload Photo
Yew Tree Farmhouse	Mayfield and Five Ashes, Wealden	Farmhouse	18th century front	26 November 1953	TQ5919727110; 51°01′17″N 0°16′06″E	1193488	Yew Tree Farmhouse More images
Hollis Street Farmhouse	Ninfield, Wealden	Farmhouse	Or earlier	13 October 1952	TQ7107611276; 50°52′32″N 0°25′49″E	1353382	Upload Photo
Luxford House	Ninfield, Wealden	Farmhouse	Late 17th century	13 October 1952	TQ6922812793; 50°53′23″N 0°24′17″E	1043114	Upload Photo
Standard Hill Farmhouse	Ninfield, Wealden	Farmhouse	1659	13 October 1952	TQ6969112674; 50°53′19″N 0°24′40″E	1043113	Upload Photo
Tanyard House	Russell's Green, Ninfield, Wealden	House	18th century	13 October 1952	TQ6982310917; 50°52′22″N 0°24′44″E	1043118	Upload Photo
The Chapel at Otteham Court to the North West of the House	Polegate, Wealden	Abbey	c. 1350	13 October 1952	TQ5875405712; 50°49′45″N 0°15′10″E	1182639	Upload Photo
Flight of Steps with Retaining Wall, Pool and Statue about 110m east of Rotherfield Hall	Jarvis Brook, Rotherfield, Wealden	Garden Steps	Probably 1897	22 May 1989	TQ5440228974; 51°02′22″N 0°12′03″E	1353721	Upload Photo
Pond with Statue in Walled Garden to West of Rotherfield	Jarvis Brook, Rotherfield, Wealden	Statue	Probably 1897	22 May 1989	TQ5426228988; 51°02′22″N 0°11′56″E	1027953	Upload Photo
Rotherfield Hall	Jarvis Brook, Rotherfield, Wealden	House	1535	26 November 1953	TQ5429128983; 51°02′22″N 0°11′58″E	1353619	Rotherfield Hall
Series of 4 Bridges over Stream and Inlet to West of Rotherfield Hall	Jarvis Brook, Rotherfield, Wealden	Bridge	1897	22 May 1989	TQ5412829060; 51°02′25″N 0°11′49″E	1027954	Upload Photo
South West Gateway to Rotherfield Hall	Jarvis Brook, Rotherfield, Wealden	Gate	1897	22 May 1989	TQ5402628896; 51°02′20″N 0°11′44″E	1027955	South West Gateway to Rotherfield Hall
Walled Garden to West of Rotherfield Hall including Terrace, Walls, Steps, Arcade, Summerhouse and 2 Gazebos	Jarvis Brook, Rotherfield, Wealden	Balustrade	1897	22 May 1989	TQ5426728960; 51°02′21″N 0°11′56″E	1252660	Upload Photo
Cobb Court	Selmeston, Wealden	House	18th century	13 October 1952	TQ5228908048; 50°51′07″N 0°09′44″E	1353394	Cobb Court
Mays, flanking Walls and Gate-piers	Selmeston, Wealden	House	18th century	13 October 1952	TQ5208607874; 50°51′01″N 0°09′33″E	1043056	Mays, flanking Walls and Gate-piers More images
Copping Hall	Uckfield, Wealden	House	Early 18th century	26 November 1953	TQ4719621451; 50°58′25″N 0°05′43″E	1353642	Copping Hall More images
Hempstead Manor Farmhouse	Uckfield, Wealden	Farmhouse	15th century	26 November 1953	TQ4859721730; 50°58′33″N 0°06′55″E	1028392	Upload Photo
Hooke Hall	Uckfield, Wealden	House	18th century	26 November 1953	TQ4742221525; 50°58′27″N 0°05′54″E	1194393	Hooke Hall More images
Barn about 50m north of Chittinghurst	Tidebrook, Wadhurst, Wealden	House	Possibly part used as such	12 October 1989	TQ6154229088; 51°02′18″N 0°18′10″E	1027956	Upload Photo
Great Shoesmiths Farmhouse	Wadhurst, Wealden	Farmhouse	15th century	26 November 1953	TQ6280934593; 51°05′15″N 0°19′24″E	1353651	Upload Photo
Riverhall	Wadhurst, Wealden	House	16th century	26 November 1953	TQ6054333324; 51°04′36″N 0°17′25″E	1028091	Upload Photo
The Vicarage	Wadhurst, Wealden	Vicarage	Early 18th century	26 November 1953	TQ6394231906; 51°03′47″N 0°20′18″E	1194656	The Vicarage More images
Walland	Wadhurst, Wealden	Timber Framed House	15th century	26 November 1953	TQ6414430171; 51°02′51″N 0°20′25″E	1194538	Upload Photo
Wenbans	Scrag Oak, Wadhurst, Wealden	House	16th century	26 November 1953	TQ6336929780; 51°02′39″N 0°19′45″E	1285557	Upload Photo
Cralle Place	Warbleton, Wealden	House	16th century	13 October 1952	TQ6084416073; 50°55′18″N 0°17′13″E	1028562	Upload Photo
Kingsley Hill	Warbleton Village, Warbleton, Wealden	Timber Framed House	Maybe late 17th century	30 August 1966	TQ6156717964; 50°56′19″N 0°17′53″E	1353415	Upload Photo
Stone House	Rushlake Green Village, Warbleton, Wealden	House	Early 16th century	13 October 1952	TQ6291718512; 50°56′35″N 0°19′03″E	1043044	Stone House More images
The Old Rectory	Warbleton Village, Warbleton, Wealden	House	15th century	30 August 1966	TQ6130817915; 50°56′17″N 0°17′40″E	1198296	Upload Photo
The Priory	Rushlake Green, Warbleton, Wealden	House	c. 1413	30 August 1966	TQ6406118135; 50°56′22″N 0°20′01″E	1043041	Upload Photo
Tom Beckworth	Rushlake Green Village, Warbleton, Wealden	House	Older	13 October 1952	TQ6266318222; 50°56′26″N 0°18′50″E	1043047	Upload Photo
Windmill Hill Place (PGL residential children's activity Centre)	Windmill Hill, Wartling, Wealden	House	c. 1790	12 August 1981	TQ6551011857; 50°52′57″N 0°21′05″E	1184336	Windmill Hill Place (PGL residential children's activity Centre)
Old Oak House	Westham, Wealden	Timber Framed House	15th century	13 October 1952	TQ6411104596; 50°49′04″N 0°19′42″E	1184666	Old Oak House More images
Stone Cross Windmill	Westham, Wealden	Windmill	1876-77	13 October 1952	TQ6196304316; 50°48′57″N 0°17′52″E	1184750	Stone Cross Windmill More images
The Dial House	Westham, Wealden	Timber Framed House	15th century	13 October 1952	TQ6408504584; 50°49′03″N 0°19′41″E	1028496	The Dial House More images
Polegate (Ovenden's) Windmill	Willingdon and Jevington, Wealden	Tower Mill	1817	13 October 1952	TQ5815204072; 50°48′53″N 0°14′37″E	1043086	Polegate (Ovenden's) Windmill More images
Duckings	Withyham, Wealden	Farmhouse	From 18th century or 19th century	26 November 1953	TQ4983635779; 51°06′06″N 0°08′19″E	1180420	Upload Photo
Glen Andred	Groombridge, Withyham, Wealden	House	1866-7	18 April 1973	TQ5289835692; 51°06′01″N 0°10′56″E	1353682	Upload Photo
Penns in the Rocks	Groombridge, Withyham, Wealden	House	About 1700	26 November 1953	TQ5208934607; 51°05′26″N 0°10′13″E	1180617	Upload Photo
