= Roland Gwynne =

British politician (1882 – 1971)

46th Mayor of Eastbourne
- In office 1928–1931
- Preceded by: Alderman Alice Hudson (1877–1960)
- Succeeded by: Mr Alderman L. Maclachlan

Personal details
- Born: 16 May 1882
- Died: 15 November 1971 (aged 89) Eastbourne, Sussex, England
- Party: Conservative

Lieutenant-Colonel Sir Roland Vaughan Gwynne DSO, DL, JP (16 May 1882 – 15 November 1971) was a British soldier and politician who served as Mayor of Eastbourne, Sussex, from 1928 to 1931. He was also a patient, close friend, and probable lover of the suspected serial killer Dr John Bodkin Adams.

== Childhood ==
Gwynne's father, James Eglinton Anderson Gwynne (1832–1915), had made a fortune in the nineteenth century from an engineering business, Gwynnes Limited, and bought estates in Sussex with the proceeds. Gwynne's mother, Mary Earle Purvis (1841–1923), was 41 when he was born. He was the last of nine children (though two had died). Until the age of 13, he was dressed by his mother as a girl in frocks, with bows, necklaces and long ringlets. He was educated privately before being sent to Trinity Hall, Cambridge.

The renowned harpsichordist Violet Gordon-Woodhouse was one of his sisters. One brother, Rupert, was Member of Parliament for Eastbourne from 1910 until his death in 1924; the celebrated cookery writer Elizabeth David was a daughter of Rupert.

His mother's great-grandfather was Dutch and great-grandmother was a Sumatran.

== Career ==
After university he served in the honorary post of Judge's Marshal. He was commissioned into the Sussex Yeomanry as a second lieutenant on 2 April 1904 and was subsequently promoted to lieutenant on 28 January 1907 and captain on 3 July 1910. He resigned from the Yeomanry on 27 July 1912.

In 1904 Gwynne aided Viscount Turnour in his maiden election campaign in the constituency of Horsham, which Turnour then held for the next 47 years. In 1910 Gwynne was called to the bar at the Inner Temple, where he practised in the Probate and Divorce Division.

The First World War broke out when Gwynne was 32. He was sent a white feather, a symbol of cowardice, by a "friend of the family". He was re-commissioned into the Sussex Yeomanry as a captain on 5 October 1914. In October 1916 he went out to the Western Front as a Temporary Major with a draft of dismounted men from 2/1st Sussex Yeomanry to reinforce the 10th (Service) Battalion, Queen's (Royal West Surrey Regiment) (Battersea). By February 1917 he had become second-in-command of 10th Queen's and led almost the whole strength of the battalion in a large daylight raid on the Hollandscheschuur Salient on 24 February. Gwynne was among those wounded in the action, but it was considered a great success and the battalion received praise from the Army Commander, General Sir Herbert Plumer, the Commander-in-Chief, Field Marshal Sir Douglas Haig, and the Prince of Wales. Gwyne was awarded the Distinguished Service Order (DSO) (much to the surprise of his family) and was decorated with the ribbon in the market square at Steenvoorde on 1 April by the divisional commander. He served with 10th Queen's at the Battle of Messines in June 1917 and when the battalion's commanding officer left to command a brigade Gwynne was promoted to acting Lieutenant-Colonel to succeed him. The opening of the Third Battle of Ypres on 1 August 1917 was a disaster for 10th Queen's. Their guide got lost and the battalion was late reaching its jumping-off line and was suffering from enemy shellfire. Realising that they were too late to gain protection from the Creeping barrage, Gwynne went into No man's land alone to see if it would be possible to advance without it, but he was hit twice in the thigh by machine gun bullets, shattering the bone into 12 pieces and severing an artery. With dawn coming up he would be left for dead. He began quietly blowing his whistle and luckily Lt Lawrie Inkster heard it and organised a stretcher party to rescue him. Gwynne was unable to get a medal for Inkster, but sent him a silver cigarette case and money for the stretcher party. In England the doctors saved Gwynne's leg but he was left with a permanent limp and his active service was over. He ended the war with rank of lieutenant-colonel.

On 8 April 1921, he was made a Deputy Lieutenant of Sussex. In 1922, his mother died, leaving most of her money to Gwynne due to a family disagreement. That year, Gwynne put his name forward as a Conservative candidate for Lewes, but withdrew it when his brother Neville hinted to the selection committee that Gwynne was a homosexual (around this time MP Noel Pemberton Billing was leading a witch hunt against homosexuals). John Bodkin Adams arrived in Eastbourne the same year.

Rupert died in 1924, just after being re-elected to Parliament. Gwynne inherited his estate, but settled for local politics, being High Sheriff of Sussex in 1926/27 and then mayor of Eastbourne in 1928. While he was mayor, in 1929 the town bought 4,000 acres (1,600 ha) of land surrounding Beachy Head, to save it from development, costing the town around £100,000.

His term as mayor ended in 1931. On 9 November that year, he was made the 8th ever Honorary Freeman of Eastbourne for his services to the borough. He stayed in local politics, being Chairman of the East Sussex County Council from 1937 to 1940.

He constantly had financial problems, caused on the one hand by his extravagant lifestyle (he was famous for the wild parties he held at Folkington Manor, attended by, among others, The 1st Marquess of Willingdon, who had previously served as both Governor General of Canada and Viceroy of India, and Rudyard Kipling) and on the other, by his sexuality, which made him a prime target for blackmail. Indeed, his butler Wilde was known by those close to him to be one such person extorting money from him. After Gwynne's death, love letters from various local jockeys were found among his papers.

During the Second World War, he became addicted to alcohol.

In 1947, burdened with debt, he was forced to let Folkington and move into the smaller Wootton Manor.

== John Bodkin Adams ==
Gwynne never married but he developed a close friendship with Dr John Bodkin Adams, an unmarried Eastbourne general practitioner and suspected serial killer, with whom he went on frequent shooting holidays to Scotland and Ireland. He would visit Adams every morning at 9 a.m.

During the police investigation into Adams, a note written by a journalist was uncovered, linking Adams sexually to a member of the local police and a local magistrate. The police officer is strongly suspected to have been the Deputy Chief Constable of Eastbourne, Alexander Seekings, and the magistrate to have been Gwynne. Despite the illegality of homosexual sex in the 1950s, the matter was not investigated further by police.

In 1956, Adams was arrested on suspicion of murdering two of his patients. At that time Gwynne was Chairman of the Magistrates in Lewes, East Sussex, and had to step down from the committal hearing owing to a conflict of interest.

Gwynne was knighted (for public service in Sussex) in the New Year Honours list for 1957, just before Adams' trial began.

During the proceedings, though, Colonel Gwynne was seen dining with Lord Goddard, the Lord Chief Justice, and Sir Hartley Shawcross, a former Attorney General, at a hotel in Lewes. Lord Goddard had by then already appointed the judge for Adams' case, Sir Patrick Devlin.

After their meeting at the hotel Gwynne crashed his car while driving home. No evidence was adduced he had been drinking. The meeting was seen by one of the investigating officers from Scotland Yard, Charles Hewett, as further indication that the Adams' trial was the subject of concerted judicial and political interference.

During the trial, while the jury was out considering the verdict on Adams' first charge of murder, Lord Goddard phoned Devlin to urge him, if Adams was found not guilty, to grant him bail before he was tried on a second count of murder. That surprised Devlin because, in British legal history, a person accused of murder had never been given bail.

A month after the trial on 10 May 1957, Goddard heard a contempt of court case against magazine Newsweek and the shop chain W. H. Smith & Son, which on 1 April during Adams' trial had respectively published and distributed an issue of the magazine containing two paragraphs of material "highly prejudicial to the accused", saying that Adams' victim count could be "as high as 400". Each company was fined £50.

Adams was sensationally acquitted of one murder charge, with a second charge being controversially withdrawn by the Attorney General.

Gwynne's relationship with Adams cooled and, when interviewed by police in connection with the investigation into Adams, he admitted that he had given instructions to be buried in a lead-lined coffin. That unusual procedure was usually designed to protect the water table from contamination or to preserve evidence in case an exhumation might be necessary.

== Post Adams ==
Gwynne fell into depression and in 1963 suffered a stroke. He was admitted to Berrow Nursing and Convalescent Home in Eastbourne in March 1964, having executed a power of attorney allowing Sir Dingwall Bateson to take control of his financial and property affairs. After Bateson's death in 1967, Gwynne's solicitors applied to the Court of Protection for the appointment of a receiver to take over from Bateson. No family members were able or willing to take on the role, and so the Official Solicitor was appointed. According to Gwynne's physician, he was unable to manage his own affairs due to 'Senile dementia with arteriosclerosis'.

He died on 15 November 1971, in the nursing home, aged 89. His death certificate was signed by Adams. His last will left his estate, valued at around £1.7 million, to the late Bateson.
