= Blackham =

Village in East Sussex, England

Coordinates: 51.135208°N 0.141622°E

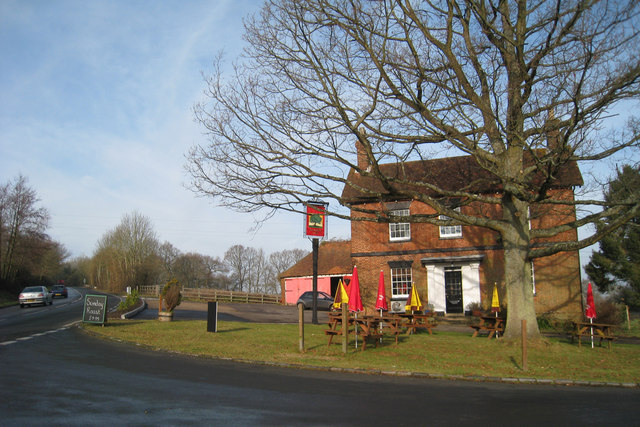
- Sussex Oak Public House, Blackham

- Location within East Sussex
- OS grid reference: TQ4993339506
- Civil parish: Withyham
- District: Wealden
- Shire county: East Sussex
- Region: South East
- Country: England
- Sovereign state: United Kingdom
- Post town: TUNBRIDGE WELLS
- Postcode district: TN3
- Dialling code: 01892
- Police: Sussex
- Fire: East Sussex
- Ambulance: South East Coast
- UK Parliament: Wealden

Blackham is a village in the Wealden district of East Sussex, England. It lies within the Withyham civil parish. Its nearest town is Royal Tunbridge Wells, which lies approximately 5.3 miles (8.5 km) east from the village. The village is situated on the East Sussex-Kent border.

The name Blackham (Black Hamlet) comes from the village being known as the resting place for smugglers returning from the coast with their booty as it was exactly one day's ride from Dover. At the time, it was described as a 'den of iniquity' due to the raucous and often violent behaviour of the smugglers. An "iron church" was built in 1884 but replaced by the All-Saints Church in 1902, which hasn't held weekly services since 2018.

The boundary of the historic Manor of Blackham is described in the Buckhurst Terrier, commissioned by Lord Buckhurst in 1597-1598 after acquiring the manors adjacent to Buckhurst Park, the family seat of the Sackvilles and the Earls de la Warr; the Blackham Manor was acquired on 9 November 1592. The northern boundary of the manor is the Kent Water, which joins the River Medway at the Chafford Bridge. The southern boundary is the Medway River from the Chafford Bridge to the Summerford Bridge north of Withyham before becoming coterminous with the old Queen's Highway, which later became the Three Bridges to Tunbridge Wells Central Line and which is presently the Forest Way rail trail. The boundary of the manor then follows north the Edenbridge-Hartfield Road past Bolebroke Castle before reaching the A264 where it takes a slant to the northwest past Holtye Common and meets the Kent Water to close the loop.

The modern description of Blackham however typically refers to the "horsehead" shaped area formed by the A264, Sussex Lane, and the Southern Railway serving Ashurst.

Hever Castle (the childhood home of Anne Boleyn), Penshurst Place and Bolebroke Castle, all regularly frequented by Henry VIII are all within 4 miles of Blackham as is the village of Hartfield - the home of Christopher Robin, Winnie-the-Pooh, and the actual "Pooh Bridge" location in Ashdown Forest where people still play poohsticks.
