= Folkington Manor =

Country house in East Sussex, England

Coordinates: 50°48′49.1″N 0°12′52.5″E

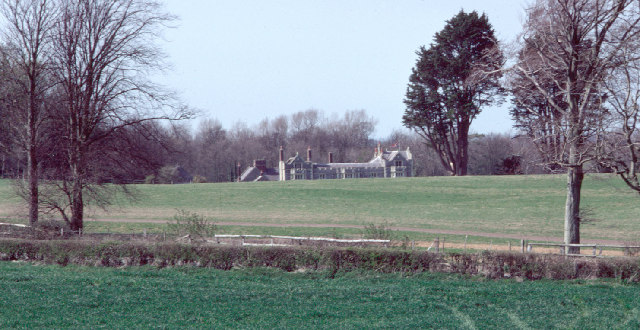
Folkington Manor

Folkington Manor (pronounced Fo'ington) is a grade II* listed country house situated in the village of Folkington two miles (3.2 km) west of Polegate, East Sussex, England.

== History ==
Folkington Manor was built in 1843 by the architect W. J. Donthorne, near the site of a manor that was recorded in the Domesday Book. The previous manor was home to Viscount Monckton in the 14th century, advisor to King Edward III. The Place, as it was formerly called, is a site of some antiquity, having been the seat of the Culpepers in James I's reign and later of the Dobell family, from whom it was bought in about 1650 by Sir William Thomas, of West Dean with the adjoining manor of Wootton.

The old house was largely demolished circa 1820. In 1838, Folkington together with the manor at nearby Wootton were bought by Thomas Sheppard, M.P for Frome, who thereupon built the present manor at a new site slightly to the north. Folkington Place, situated on the original manorial site, retains some architectural elements of the pre-1820 manor. After the death of Thomas Sheppard’s son in 1875 both properties were sold to Mr J. E. A. Gwynne and in 1915 passed to the latter’s son, Col. Rupert Gwynne, M.P for Eastbourne 1910-24. Rupert Gwynne was father of Elizabeth David, the pre-eminent British cookery writer of the mid 20th century, and brother of Violet Gordon Woodhouse, the musician. On his death the house passed into the hands of his younger brother Roland Gwynne, Mayor of Eastbourne 1928-31.

As noted in a Country Life editorial in 1958, Folkington has had a close connection with art for some time – a tradition which continues to this day with the Manor containing a number of galleries suitable for displaying large amounts of fine art. Indeed the well known Long Man of Wilmington stands in the distance on Windover Hill. The Stacy-Marks family bought the property in the late 1960s and the Flint Rooms were the core of the well-respected art business that has flourished for many years. In Autumn 2010 the Manor was purchased by Dr Harry Brünjes and Mrs Jacqueline Brünjes and has recently undergone a complete restoration.

The herbalist Nicholas Culpeper lived in the village in the 17th century.

== Gardens and grounds ==
Folkington Manor stands in a secluded position at the foot of the South Downs in 85 acres of parkland. The main grounds lie principally to the north and east of the house, with sweeping lawns surrounding an ornamental pond with many spring bulbs, specimen trees including cedar, yew, horse chestnut and lime leading out to a large informal area of parkland fringed with semi-mature trees and flanked on the southern side by the gravelled drive. To the south of the drive are 3 large railed paddocks with parkland trees including pine and chestnut, as well as a grass gallop that extends for approximately 1.5 miles. To the south of the house are yew hedges, shrub borders and steps leading up to a further area of mature wooded garden with two greenhouses and a sunken dell. There are 3 more paddocks and further woodland to the west.

A fine stone paved terrace runs along the east facade of Folkington Manor, overlooking a neatly clipped knot garden with flint paths surrounded by trimmed yew hedges, garden ornaments and a bank of spring bulbs.

== Folkington Manor Stables ==
The main stable yard has 17 boxes, tack rooms and feed rooms and lies immediately west of the house. Folkington Manor Stables was formerly a horse racing training establishment. Today Folkington Manor Stables operates a small, exclusive, part livery service. An outdoor school measuring approximately 65 x 35m serves the stables as well as direct access to the stunning South Downs.

== Notable owners ==
Former owners include Rupert Gwynne, MP for Eastbourne 1910–24 and father of food writer, Elizabeth David, who inherited the house from his father. On his death the house passed into the hands of his younger brother Roland Gwynne, Mayor of Eastbourne 1928–31, and the possible lover of suspected serial killer John Bodkin Adams.

The owner since 2010 is Harry Brünjes.

== Popular culture ==
The house was used as a location for the 1948 film version of the George Moore novel Esther Waters. The film, directed by Ian Dalrymple and Peter Proud, starred Kathleen Ryan (in the title role), Dirk Bogarde (as William Latch), Cyril Cusack, Ivor Barnard and Fay Compton. The story of an unmarried housemaid who becomes pregnant and is abandoned by her footman lover, Esther Waters was the most "English" of his novels. Moore had just returned to England after abandoning his brief interest in the Irish Renaissance theatre movement in 1901, in which he was a founder of the Irish Literary Theatre.

Accounts of life at Folkington Manor appear in the book Violet: The Life and Loves of Violet Gordon Woodhouse by Jessica Douglas-Home. Violet Gordon Woodhouse was the sister of Rupert Gwynne and one of the century's most gifted musicians, her salon at Wooton Manor was a rural match for London's Bloomsbury gatherings. The first chapter of the book details the long and stormy engagement between Violet's parents, James Gwynne and the musical May Purvis, there was strong opposition from the Gwynnes to James marrying someone of "questionable" descent. James and May set up house in Harley Street in London and at Folkington Manor in Sussex giving birth to Violet and her six brothers and sisters.
