= Copping =

Copping is a surname. Notable people with the surname include:

- Alice Copping (1906–1996), New Zealand nutritionist
- Barbara Copping (born 1944), Canadian politician
- Benet Copping (born 1986), Australian rules footballer
- Bobby Copping (born 2001), English footballer
- Cecil Copping (1888–1966), American composer
- Chris Copping (born 1945), English musician and singer-songwriter
- Harold Copping (1863–1932), British artist
- Jason Copping (born 1976), Canadian politician
- John Copping (died 1743), Irish clergyman
- Martin Copping (born 1977), Australian actor
- Robin Copping (1934–2022), Australian cinematographer and producer
- Stephen Copping (born 1956), Australian footballer
- Wilf Copping (1909–1980), English footballer

== See also ==
- Copping, Tasmania
- Copping Hall, historic building in East Sussex, England
- Rogerus Coppyng (fl. 1300–01), English politician
