= Ashdown House, East Sussex =

Country house in Forest Row, East Sussex, England

Ashdown House
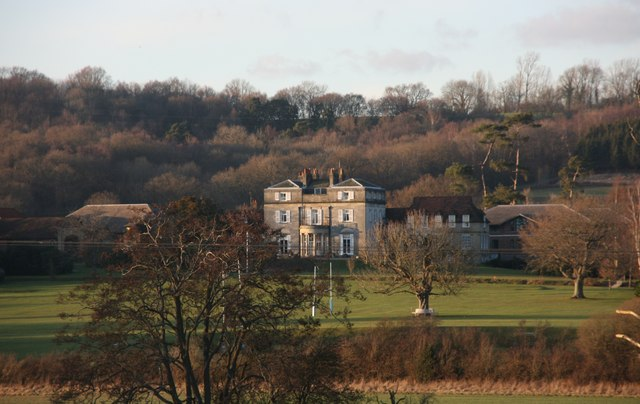
- Former names: Lavertye (Lavortye, Lavertie); Ashdown Park

General information
- Status: Former school; consented for residential conversion
- Type: English country house
- Architectural style: Greek Revival
- Location: Forest Row, East Sussex, United Kingdom
- Coordinates: 51°06′09″N 0°03′46″E
- Construction started: 1793; 233 years ago
- Completed: c. 1795
- Client: John Trayton Fuller and Anne Fuller

Design and construction
- Architect: Benjamin Henry Latrobe (1764–1820)
- Location within East Sussex
- 51.1026°N 0.0629°E

Listed Building – Grade II*
- Official name: Ashdown House School
- Designated: 26 November 1953
- Reference no.: 1286907

Ashdown House is a Grade II* listed country house about 1 mile (1.6 km) east of Forest Row, East Sussex, England. Its principal block was designed by Benjamin Henry Latrobe for John Trayton Fuller and his wife Anne and built between 1793 and 1795, as an extension of Lavertye, a late 16th century manor house which Latrobe incorporated as the new house's service wing.

With Hammerwood Park, 3 miles (4.8 km) to the north, it is one of only two buildings designed by Latrobe in England before he emigrated to the United States in 1795, where he became the architect of the United States Capitol.

The house is a compact three-storey villa of ashlar sandstone. Its best-known feature is a semicircular Ionic portico, modelled on the order of the Erechtheion in Athens, which is set into the south front and covered by a shallow dome of interlocking Coade stone coffers. Architectural historians have singled out its interior sequence of rotunda, stair hall and column-screened upper hall as an early statement of ideas that Latrobe later developed at the Capitol; Pevsner called Ashdown "very perfect indeed".

From 1886 until 2020 the house was occupied by Ashdown House School, a preparatory school, which added a chapel, classroom wings and other buildings around it. After the school closed, the site was sold in 2021 to a property developer, and in 2025 Wealden District Council granted planning permission for conversion and redevelopment of the surrounding area as 45 homes.

== Site ==
The house stands on the crest of a ridge in the High Weald National Landscape, facing south over a gentle valley through which the River Medway flows, with views towards Ashdown Forest. It is reached by a lane running north from Hartfield Road (the B2110). The original drive crosses the Medway by a bridge over and approaches the house diagonally from the south-west. The underlying geology is sandstone and siltstone of the Ashdown Formation.

== History ==
=== Manor of Lavertye ===
A house has stood on the site since at least the 13th century. In 1285 John de Monte Acuto was granted a licence to set up a private chapel in his house of Lavertye for the use of his mother. By the late 16th century the manor of Lavertye (also spelt Lavortye or Lavertie), which was subsidiary to the neighbouring manor of Brambletye, was one of seventeen manors belonging to Thomas Sackville, Lord Buckhurst. A survey of the Buckhurst manors in 1597–98 records nearly 369 acres let to John Brooker, a yeoman, for 21 years at £80 a year "together with two fat capons (alive)", and describes the house as:

built with brick, covered with Horsham stone and Shingle, with a brick wall enclosed, and the several court yards, gardens, orchards, closes, rooms, two old dwelling houses, a great barn, a stall stable, hayhouse, dove house, Hemplands etc.

The manor was sold to the Newnham family of Maresfield in 1690.

=== The Fullers and Latrobe ===
The new house was commissioned by John Trayton Fuller (1743–-1811), who called himself "Trayton" perhaps to distinguish himself from his better-known cousin, John "Mad Jack" Fuller of Rosehill, Brightling, and by his second wife, Anne (née Eliott). The Fullers had risen to prominence in Sussex through the iron-founding industry. Trayton's father, Thomas Fuller, was a West India merchant who owned the Hermon Hill plantation in Jamaica. Anne was the daughter of George Augustus Eliott, Lord Heathfield, the defender of Gibraltar during the Great Siege. On his death in 1790 she received a considerable legacy, while his house, Bayley Park, where the couple had been living, passed to her brother. According to Fazio and Snadon, the need to move, combined with Anne's inheritance, prompted the Fullers to build. They leased Kidbrook, about two miles to the west, for £300 a year while the house was built.

Latrobe had come to the Fullers' attention through his work at nearby Hammerwood for John and Harriet Sperling. Rudolph Ackermann's 1821 obituary of Latrobe states that Hammerwood "obtained for him the further patronage of Mr. Trayton Fuller, for whom he designed a house at Ashdown Park". In October 1792 Latrobe's brother, Christian Ignatius Latrobe, recorded in his journal that Benjamin had "business with Mr. Fuller at Kidbrook", which Fazio and Snadon take as evidence that the design was being prepared that autumn and winter. The purchase of the Lavertye estate from John Newnham was confirmed by an Act of Parliament of April 1793, which authorised the transfer of part of the manor to Fuller. The Fullers renamed the property Ashdown Park, after Ashdown Forest. A county map published in 1795 names it "Ashdown Place", and by the 1840s it was known as Ashdown House.

=== Construction ===
Construction began in the spring of 1793 and the house received its fittings and furnishings in the spring and summer of 1795. The Fullers moved in that summer, shortly before Latrobe emigrated to America on 25 November 1795. Unusually among his domestic commissions, Latrobe supervised the work virtually from start to finish. Hammerwood and Ashdown were under construction at the same time and shared some craftsmen and suppliers, so Latrobe could visit both on his journeys from London.

Much of the building history is known from Trayton Fuller's "bills volume", into which he pasted bills and receipts for the work, now held by the East Sussex Record Office. It shows that Fuller controlled many of the payments himself and took a personal part in buying and carting materials, while Latrobe inspected the work and sometimes signed to approve payments. The records name C. Sandys as supervisor and John Stricker as construction foreman. The portico's column and pilaster capitals and bases and its dome came from Eleanor Coade's manufactory in London. James Messenger of London made the ironwork for the stair and balcony railings, and the London cabinet-makers Seddon, Sons and Shackleton supplied furniture. Fuller's crop book, also at the Record Office, contain annual sketch plans of the farm from 1790 onwards, which show the new house taking shape from 1793, and annual experiments with crop rotation.

=== Fuller family (1795–1910) ===
After Trayton Fuller's death in 1814 the house remained with Anne. On her death (Note: The date of Anne Fuller's death is given as 1835 by the HCUK survey and the Latrobe Heritage Trust, and as 1836 by Fazio and Snadon.) it passed to their eldest son, Augustus Eliott Fuller (1777–1857), Member of Parliament for East Sussex from 1841 to 1857. In 1834 Augustus also inherited much of the estate of his cousin "Mad Jack" Fuller, which the Latrobe Heritage Trust records as including some 270 enslaved people. In the event it was the children of Trayton and Anne Fuller who inherited the combined fortunes of the Fuller and Eliott families.

The estate next passed to Augustus's eldest son, Owen Fuller-Meyrick (1804–1876), and later to Augustus's granddaughter Clara Tapps-Gervis (1831–1910), who let the house to a school in 1886. The estate was broken up after her death in 1910. During the 19th century an L-shaped range was added behind the house (between 1808 and 1842), the western third of Latrobe's rear screen wall was demolished (by 1873), and a small extension was built on the east side.

=== School (1886–2020) ===
By 1886 the house had been leased as a boys' preparatory school run by the Lee family. The school, previously known as Connaught House, was run by William Randall Lee. In 1905 Arthur Evill married Kathleen Lee and became a partner in the school and its headmaster. The Evills bought the house from the Fuller heirs in 1910, and Arthur Evill remained owner and headmaster until c. 1939.

The school added to the house steadily over the 20th century. Additions to the west wing of the old manor house were approved in 1920, and the conservatory was altered in 1925. In 1932–33 Arthur Evill's cousin Norman Evill, who had been chief draughtsman to Edwin Lutyens, designed a memorial chapel on the west side of the house and a classroom wing on the east. The chapel was built as a war memorial, including in memory of Arthur Evill's son or sons killed in the First World War. Later works included a pavilion (1951), a replacement swimming pool (1955), a new wing (1958), a laboratory (1964) and Beech House (1973).

In July 1975 the school passed from its owner-headmasters to a charity, Ashdown House School Trust Ltd. Girls were admitted from 1976, and a further building programme followed, including the Centenary Arts Centre (1986) and a new refectory, Williamson Hall. Several buildings of the 1970s to 1990s were designed by Edward Hill and Chris Mitchell, including a science block of the early 1990s. In 2009 the school passed to the Cothill Educational Trust, later renamed the Prep Schools Trust.

The school closed in June 2020. According to the Latrobe Heritage Trust, the COVID-19 pandemic had led to a loss of financial support.

==== Historic abuse allegations ====
Allegations by multiple former pupils of physical and sexual abuse in the 1970s, investigated by law firm Slater & Gordon in 2013, were followed by widespread recollections from former pupils that the regime at the school in the late 20th century had been spartan and unforgiving, with boys or entire classes regularly punished with canings. Abuse at the school is much of the subject of former pupil Alex Renton's book Stiff Upper Lip and his BBC Radio 4 documentary In Dark Corners, and is referred to in the memoirs of Andrew Mitchell.

In July 2014, Clive Williams, who was headmaster from 1975 to 2003, was interviewed by Sussex Police following allegations of sexual assault and child neglect. A computer and documents were taken from his home for examination. He was released on bail the same day, until 11 November, and was understood not to have been charged. The police said their investigation spanned the period from the late 1960s to the early 1980s.

In January 2023 David Price, 76, who had taught at the school in the 1980s, was charged with three counts of indecent assault in the 1980s and was due in court in the following month. He was arrested after an 11-page account detailing alleged abuse was submitted to Cape Town police by a former pupil of Western Province preparatory school in the city. The complainant came forward after claims were made against Price and other former teachers by Alex Renton.

==== Notable former pupils ====
- David Armstrong-Jones, 2nd Earl of Snowdon, furniture maker
- Obi Asika, media mogul
- Thomas Cholmondeley (1968–2016), Kenyan farmer
- Nicholas Coleridge, publisher
- Charlie Cox, actor
- James Innes, author
- Boris Johnson, former Prime Minister of the United Kingdom
- Jo Johnson, politician
- Rachel Johnson, writer and journalist
- Damian Lewis, actor
- Nick Macpherson, civil servant
- Andrew Mitchell, politician
- Alex Renton, journalist and author
- Joseph Simpson (1909–1968), Commissioner of the Metropolitan Police
- Fischer Watson (1884–1960), Royal Navy officer

=== Sale and redevelopment ===
In 2021 the site was sold to Even Ashdown Ltd, part of the Even Group, a housing developer, for £5.95 million. In September 2022 the developer applied for planning permission (WD/2022/2372/MAJ) and listed building consent (WD/2022/2373/LB) to convert the house to apartments. The scheme also proposed to demolish some later school buildings, including a sports hall, Norman Evill's 1930s east wing and later rear extensions, and to build new houses. Historic England advised that the internal subdivision and the layout of new building should be revised to reduce harm to the listed building and its setting, and in 2023 the developer commissioned Purcell to prepare revised proposals based on the site's historic layout.

The Latrobe Heritage Trust, a charity dedicated to Latrobe's work, objected to the scheme. It argued that dividing the main house into flats, and the fire-protection works this would require, would cause unacceptable harm to its interiors, and that the design of the new houses was out of keeping with the setting. The Trust also raised concerns about the condition of the empty building, which it described as unheated and suffering from water ingress through rotting windows, defective rainwater goods and slipped slates. Wealden District Council's Planning Committee North considered both applications on 27 March 2025, and planning permission was granted that month for 45 homes.

== Architecture ==
=== Plan and relationship to the old house ===
Rather than demolish or encase the old manor house, as he had done at Hammerwood, Latrobe set the new house immediately in front of it, slightly to the south and east. This gave the new rooms the southern views and aspect, while the Tudor house became the service block, with kitchens, storerooms, a laundry and servants' rooms. Because the services were housed in the old block, the new house needed to contain only the principal rooms and the family's bedchambers, which accounts for its moderate size. It measures about 60 feet (18 m) wide by 40 feet (12 m) deep. The house stands on an artificial earth terrace about 80 feet (24 m) square, which drops about 6 feet (1.8 m) on its south and east sides to the natural slope and is climbed on the central axis by a stone stair. The groin-vaulted masonry cellars were partly dug into the hillside and partly built above ground, then buried when the terrace was formed.

The presence of the old house to the north meant that the new house had only one principal front, on the south, which served as both entrance and garden front. This was contrary to the usual English practice of placing these on opposite sides of a house. A central hall runs from the front to the back of the new house. The main and service stairs are placed at the rear so that they serve both buildings. The landing of the main stair gives onto the first floor of the old house, whose lower storeys put it between the floor levels of the new block. The service stair also rises to the new house's top storey. On the north-west, a small hyphen, originally of two storeys, links the two houses and serves as a side entrance. Behind both houses Latrobe laid out a service court with a stable and coach-house block (see below).

=== Exterior ===
The new block is built of cut sandstone ashlar with a slate roof. It is three storeys high, with a cornice above the first floor. The top storey is built in three sections: the outer two are flush with the walls below and joined by a parapet, and the recessed, slate-hung centre stands behind it. As at Hammerwood, Latrobe did without the traditional rusticated basement storey, so that the main floor sits close to the ground like a Greek temple. He opened the house to its surroundings with arched openings, full-length windows and glazed doors. On the ground floor, French windows set in arcading flank the portico.

The centre of the south front is filled by a semicircular Ionic temple of three columns and two pilasters, one storey high, with an iron railing above. The order follows the Erechtheion anta capitals, as published by Julien-David Le Roy. The capitals and bases are of Coade stone. The little temple served both as the entrance vestibule and as a garden pavilion from which to view the landscape. It was originally open. Its inner wall was fitted with windows and shutters that could open the rotunda to the house, and the present glazing between the columns is a later addition.

The rotunda is roofed by a very shallow dome of 100 coffers diminishing towards a scalloped centrepiece. Each coffer is a separate piece of Coade stone, and the pieces interlock by tongue and groove to form a self-supporting structure of precast modules. Fazio and Snadon describe Latrobe's use of Coade stone here as "technically and stylistically unique". Latrobe did not use the device of a semicircular portico on any other project until his redesign of the President's House in Washington.

Fazio and Snadon suggest that Latrobe gave Hammerwood and Ashdown "different genders". Hammerwood, a seasonal hunting lodge, received a bold, primitive Greek Doric order, which Vitruvius characterised as masculine. Ashdown, a year-round family home for local gentry, received the Ionic order of the Erechtheion, "the most obviously 'feminine' of ancient Greek buildings". They also place the two houses in the two categories into which John Summerson divided late-18th-century English country houses. Hammerwood looks like a "greater house" but functioned as a villa, while Ashdown looks like a villa but functioned more like a traditional country house.

About 33.5 metres (110 ft) north of the house stands part of a monumental stone screen wall in the Tuscan order. Fazio and Snadon attribute it to Latrobe as the north side of his service court, probably screening the stables. About two-thirds survive; the western third had been demolished by 1873.

=== Interior ===
Visitors enter through the portico rotunda into the lower hall. Along its side walls are six full pilasters and two quarter-pilasters of the same Erechtheion anta order as the rotunda. The stair was originally an "Imperial" staircase, with a central flight dividing into two. Its twin return flights met at a half-circular balcony projecting into the upper hall. In the early 20th century the lower flight was rebuilt against the east wall. The ceiling above the stair has a central circle, like a flat dome, surrounded by square coffers. The room to the west of the hall, probably the original drawing room, has pairs of pilasters with modified Tower of the Winds capitals flanking the front window, carrying a plaster frieze of alternating anthemions and palmettes adapted from the Erechtheion.

In the upper hall, horizontal entablatures pass across half-domed apses on pairs of free-standing columns with Coade stone Tower of the Winds capitals. Fazio and Snadon suggest that this space was designed with an awareness of Henry Holland's entrance hall at Carlton House, London. Patrick Snadon describes the "basilica-form, column-screened apses" giving access to the bedchambers, and an upstairs sitting room with a curved, vaulted ceiling and a balcony overlooking the landscape. Three of the four upper bedrooms have apsidal ends with shallow plaster half-domes resting against segmental vaults. Fazio and Snadon call these "miniature prototypes" for Latrobe's House and Senate chambers in the United States Capitol.

Fazio and Snadon argue that at Ashdown, Latrobe went further than any architect of his generation in creating "interior scenery", in which spaces were arranged on the compositional principles of 18th century landscape design. They describe the sequence from rotunda to lower hall, stair and upper hall as "crowding, overlapping, and interpenetrating spatial units and architectural events in a dynamic, compacted, and even disturbing way". In their reading, it is a vertical reinterpretation of the horizontal processional route of the traditional English country house, leading from the landscape outside and "returning finally to landscape views". Details of the fireplaces and doors match those at Hammerwood, though Ashdown's doors are of polished wood where Hammerwood's are painted in trompe-l'œil.

=== Tudor range ===
The surviving parts of Lavertye form the north side of the complex. An archaeological survey carried out in 2022 found that it was a hall house of two storeys and attics, aligned east–west, with gabled cross-wings at each end projecting about 1.2–1.5 metres (3.9–4.9 ft) forward of the centre. The south front was of stone, with mullioned windows in moulded surrounds under drip moulds. The other elevations were timber-framed and probably hung with red clay tiles. The west gable survives on the south front with its eight-light ground-floor window. The east wing's southern gable was covered by Latrobe's link building, but it can still be seen in a light well between the two phases, which was apparently designed to bring daylight into the old rooms.

=== Other buildings ===
An archway to the west of the house, which may have been moved there in the late 19th century from the rear service court, is listed separately at Grade II. Norman Evill's chapel of 1932–33, connected to the Tudor range by a cloister, and his east classroom wing were both attached to the house before 1948. The Latrobe Heritage Trust therefore considers them to be protected as part of the listed building's curtilage.

== Landscape ==
The Fullers' crop books show that the estate was a working farm, with arable and hay fields on the south-facing slopes and mown meadows by the Medway. By 1795 a sweeping drive had been laid out across the fields from the river bridge to the house. A county map published that year distinguishes a small park around the drive from the surrounding farmland. In 1796 the field south of the house was taken into the park. Hurdles were used in place of hedges to control stock, and hay continued to be cut from the parkland. Behind the house were a walled kitchen garden and a pond. A long east–west ditch about 100 feet (30 m) south of the house, invisible from it, probably served as a ha-ha.

Fazio and Snadon consider the landscape consistent with the theories of Latrobe's friend Humphry Repton, with an open, park-like treatment of the hillside and "the appropriation of distant views beyond the estate boundaries". A 2023 landscape assessment for the developer instead judged the layout modest and simple. It concluded that any professional input was most likely Latrobe's own, and that Repton's involvement was "very unlikely". It found that the whole of the 1790s drive and the open rural setting to the south survive. The kitchen garden has been lost under school buildings and tennis courts, and the pond is silting up. The terraces below the south front and the Wellingtonias and other exotic conifers east of the house date from the mid-19th century. The assessment rated the surviving designed landscape as of regional significance. The Latrobe Heritage Trust has argued, citing lidar evidence of possible alterations to the watercourse, that the landscape merits further research and registration in its own right.

== Reception and significance ==
Around 1805, an English visitor who had seen Latrobe's Bank of Pennsylvania in Philadelphia described Ashdown in a letter to an American acquaintance, who passed it to a newspaper:

Mr Fuller's house is … an exquisite morsel … I can, indeed, see nothing in Mr Fuller's house which is not right; the arrangement is judicious and perfectly convenient; no room is lost; everything is where it should be … the circular portico is not to be found elsewhere, excepting, perhaps, in Greece. I think, however, the thing is original … The dome is made of Coade's artificial stone … It is, by far, the prettiest thing of that manufactory, which has produced so many pretty things.

Talbot Hamlin, in his Pulitzer Prize-winning biography of Latrobe (1955), judged Ashdown "more polished and more completely achieved" than Hammerwood. He also saw it as "closely related" to the Markoe house that Latrobe designed in Philadelphia fifteen years later, which was demolished in the 1880s. James Stevens Curl describes Hammerwood and Ashdown as "two of the most remarkable buildings for their date in the British Isles". Fazio and Snadon, whose study The Domestic Architecture of Benjamin Henry Latrobe (2006) contains the most detailed published analysis of the house, argue that through "unorthodox planning, progressive use of Grecian forms, a radical simplification of the neoclassical vocabulary", and new relationships between house and landscape, Latrobe placed both houses "in the architectural avant-garde of the late eighteenth century". They write that at Ashdown he "fused the twin-towered and bow-fronted villa types and inserted a circular garden temple that itself synthesised the functions of portico, entrance vestibule, and summer saloon or garden room".

Only three of the more than sixty houses Latrobe designed in the United States survive, and all have been considerably altered. Snadon has written that Ashdown's interior sequence was a "trial run" for the circulation routes of the Capitol, with their "circular rotundas, half-domed basilicas and column screens, rising into dramatically lighted upper spaces". In his words, "Latrobe's brilliant sequence at Ashdown House is the best-preserved example of his picturesque interior scenery."

== Heritage protection ==
Ashdown House was first listed on 26 November 1953, and its list entry was last amended on 31 December 1982. The list entry, which dates the house to "circa 1790", describes it erroneously as "one of the 2 known works of the Sussex Architect, Benjamin Henry Latrobe". It does not mention the Tudor range. The archway is listed at Grade II.

In December 2022 the Latrobe Heritage Trust asked Historic England to upgrade the listing to Grade I. It argued that the existing entry predated nearly all the scholarship on Latrobe and was inaccurate and incomplete. The application was supported by a letter co-signed by Nicholas Coleridge and architectural historians. According to the Trust, Historic England declined to recommend an upgrade, on the basis that the building's significance should be protected through the planning process. Country Life was critical of Historic England's decision.

== See also ==
- Hammerwood Park
- List of works by Benjamin Henry Latrobe
- Grade II* listed buildings in Wealden
