= Rupert Gwynne =

British politician

Financial Secretary to the War Office
- In office 15 March 1923 – 23 January 1924
- Prime Minister: Bonar Law; Stanley Baldwin
- Preceded by: Stanley Jackson
- Succeeded by: John James Lawson

Personal details
- Born: 2 August 1873
- Died: 12 October 1924 (aged 51) Eastbourne, East Sussex
- Party: Conservative Party (UK)
- Children: 4
- Education: Pembroke College, Cambridge

Rupert Sackville Gwynne (2 August 1873 – 12 October 1924), was a British Conservative politician. He was Member of Parliament (MP) for Eastbourne from 1910 to 1924.

He was the father of cookery writer Elizabeth David.

== Early years ==
Gwynne was the third son and fourth child of nine children of James Eglinton Anderson Gwynne (1832–1915) of Gwynnes Limited and of Folkington Manor, Polegate, Sussex. His mother was Mary Earle Purvis (1841–1923). He was educated at Shrewsbury School and then Pembroke College, Cambridge. He was called to the Bar at the Inner Temple in 1908.

== Political career ==
Gwynne was elected as MP for Eastbourne at the January 1910 general election, and held the seat until he stood down at the 1924 general election. He was Financial Secretary to the War Office from 15 March 1923 until 23 January 1924. On 1 October 1923 he was made a member of the Army Council. He was renowned for his opposition to the Irish Republican Army which he termed "the Murder Gang".

== Family ==
Gwynne married Stella Ridley, daughter of the first Viscount Ridley in 1905 and had four daughters. One, Elizabeth, became a well-known cookery writer. Gwynne appointed as their guardians Roundell Palmer, 3rd Earl of Selborne and Douglas Hogg, 1st Viscount Hailsham.

His mother's great-grandfather was Dutch and great-grandmother was a Sumatran. Gwynne's two older brothers, Reginald and Neville, were both disinherited by their father. Gwynne therefore inherited Wootton Manor on his father's death in 1915 and with his wife commissioned their friend Detmar Blow to restore and extend the house. Other artistic friends included the painter Cedric Morris, who painted Wootton in the 1920s and the writer and plantsman William Robinson.

Gwynne's sister was the harpsichordist Violet Gordon-Woodhouse. His youngest brother, Roland Gwynne, later became Mayor of Eastbourne and was a close friend, and possible lover, of the society doctor and suspected serial killer John Bodkin Adams.

== Death ==
Gwynne had had a weak heart all his life after having contracted rheumatic fever as a youth, but died suddenly of kidney failure on 12 October 1924, aged 51. His brother, Roland, was the last person to see him alive. His death certificate had the note 'No P.M.' suggesting the doctor, Lionel Handson, was uneasy about his death and called the coroner for his advice. Roland inherited Wootton Manor, but allowed Rupert's widow, Stella, and her daughters to remain there provided Stella did not remarry.

Parliament of the United Kingdom
Preceded by Hubert Beaumont	Member of Parliament for Eastbourne; January 1910–1924	Succeeded by Sir George Lloyd
