= Hammerwood Park =

Country house near East Grinstead, Sussex, England

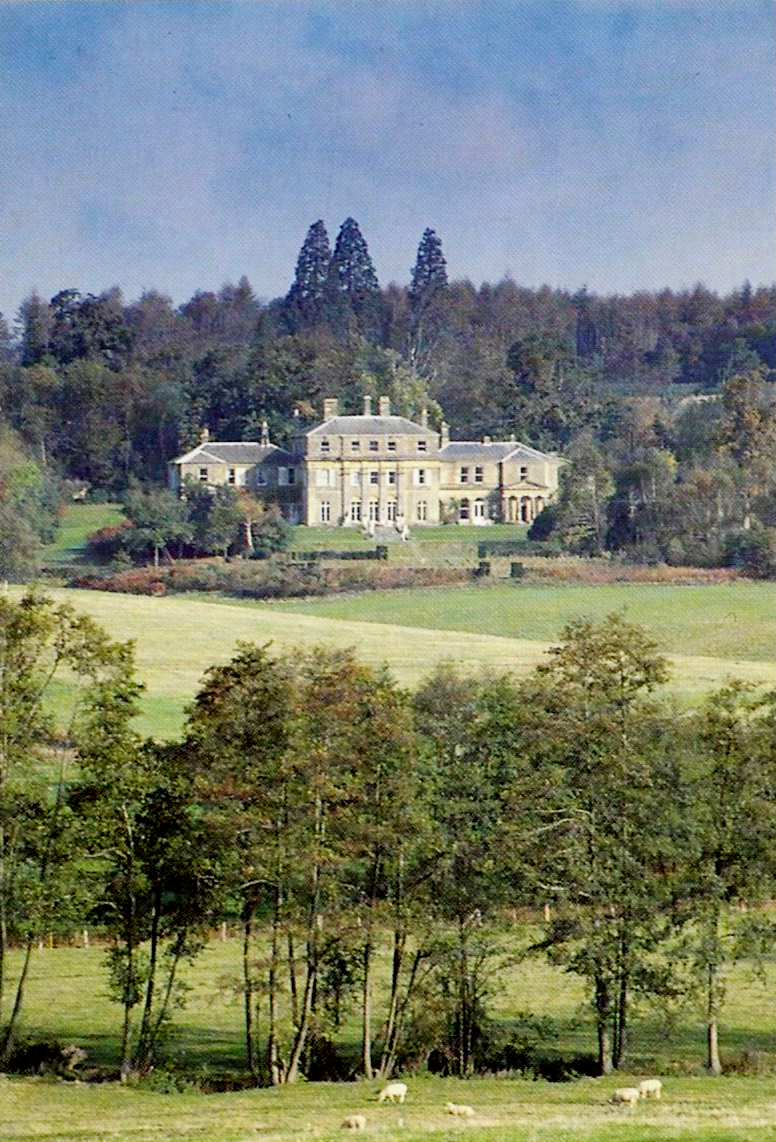
- Former names: Hammerwood Lodge

General information
- Type: English country house
- Architectural style: Greek Revival, Doric
- Location: Hammerwood, East Sussex, United Kingdom
- Construction started: 1792; 234 years ago
- Completed: c. 1795

Design and construction
- Architect: Benjamin Henry Latrobe (1764–1820)

Website
- hammerwood.co.uk
- Location within East Sussex
- 51.1312°N 0.0595°E

Listed Building – Grade I
- Designated: 26 November 1953; 72 years ago
- Reference no.: 1191730

National Register of Historic Parks and Gardens
- Type: Grade II
- Designated: 25 March 1987; 39 years ago
- Reference no.: 1000306

Hammerwood Park is a country house in Hammerwood, 2.9 miles (4.6 km) east of East Grinstead and 8.8 miles (14.2 km) west of Tunbridge Wells, in East Sussex, England. One of the first Greek Revival houses in England, it is a Grade I listed building.

Hammerwood was built in 1792–95 as the first independent work of the architect Benjamin Henry Latrobe, who left for the United States in November 1795, and is now regarded as the "father of American architecture." As the first Surveyor of the Public Buildings under Presidents Jefferson and Madison, Latrobe designed the United States Capitol – where he reused Hammerwood's distinctive, Paestum-derived Doric order for the Supreme Court Chamber – and, later, the White House's north and south porticoes.

Hammerwood is the earliest example of the Grecian style which Latrobe would employ in America as an expression of the new republic's democratic ideals, and which exerted a foundational influence on the American architectural aesthetic. Architectural historians have ranked it "among the most remarkable houses for [its] date in the British Isles," judging that Latrobe's work there elevates him to "the rank of the very first of British architects."

After the Second World War, during which the house was requisitioned for military use, it fell into serious dereliction. In 1973, it was bought by the rock band Led Zeppelin, who intended to convert it into a recording studio; instead it stood derelict and vandalised for much of the following decade. Since 1982, Hammerwood has been restored by, and has been the home of, the Pinnegar family. Open to the public since April 1983, it also hosts an annual concert series on a collection of historic keyboard instruments. Hammerwood served as the location for Beyoncé’s September 2018 Vogue cover shoot.

Its Picturesque parkland was laid out in the 1790s under the probable influence of Humphry Repton, and centred on a lake with views opening across the valley beyond, is separately Grade II listed on the National Register of Historic Parks and Gardens.

== History ==
=== The site before 1792 ===
Hammerwood sits in the High Weald, on the fringe of the Ashdown Forest, in a valley which has a long history of iron-working.

At its foot, at Far Blacklands, was the largest Roman bloomery site yet identified on the High Weald. Evidence points to iron production on an industrial scale in the first and second centuries AD. Fragments of roof tile, hypocaust tile, brick and furnace lining suggest further Roman buildings, and coins of Vespasian and Trajan have been found along with Samian and coarse pottery.

The site lies a mile (1.6 km) west of the London–Lewes Roman road, which may have carried its iron to market. A Roman tile kiln was also excavated in 1982 on Great Cansiron Farm, located between the iron-working site to the south-west and what may have been Roman iron-ore quarries to the north-east. The bloomery has been a scheduled monument since 1975.

After the Norman Conquest, the land lay within the rape of Pevensey, which William I granted to his half-brother Robert, Count of Mortain. In Domesday Book the count is recorded as tenant-in-chief at Shovelstrode, Brambletye and Hartfield in the hundred of East Grinstead. By the 1290s, the land formed part of an estate known as The Bower, straddling the parishes of East Grinstead and Hartfield, which is thought to have been part of a medieval deer park. A family named Atte Boure appears among local taxpayers under Edward I in the 1290s.

In the mid-16th century the estate was sold by Henry Chauncy (c.1527–1587), younger brother of Maurice Chauncy, to Hugh Botting, or Bottinge (d. 1560), a yeoman. In his will of 1558, he left to his widow Joan the use of the principal chamber in his "house called The Bower", and to his son Henry "two tonnes of yron". The forge stood in the valley south of the present house (coordinates: 51°07′36″N 0°03′37″E), and had a bay (dam) 200 metres (220 yd) long. John Botting "of the Bower" (d. 1622) is commemorated by an iron grave slab dated that year at Cowden church. His successor, also John, sold the estate to Edward Payne (1593–1660) in 1628. However, the Bottings remained involved: the Bower was leased back to Edmund Botting from 1645 to 1656. The forge appears to have ceased to operate around the time of the Restoration.

In 1693 the Paynes leased the estate to Alexander Luxford, who may have erected the first dwelling on the site of the present house, although the Paynes were living there by 1711. John Payne's only daughter married John Smith (c.1675–1749), rector of Withyham, and the estate passed through the Smith family. In 1766, Smith's daughter-in-law was assessed for window tax on 41 windows, the fifth-highest total among East Grinstead's 150 assessed houses. In the later eighteenth century, the Bower passed out of local hands: by 1787, it belonged to Anne, Baroness Dowager Godolphin (1722–1805), daughter of the 3rd Earl Fitzwilliam.

In November 1792, the estate was conveyed to John Sperling (1763–1851). Sperling, who already had a country seat at Dynes Hall, a 17th century country house and 500-acre (200 ha) estate in Great Maplestead, Essex, came from a wealthy merchant family which had made its fortune in the London fur trade. In 1785, he had married Harriet Rochfort (c.1758–1854), of the Rochfort family, which held estates in County Westmeath, Ireland; her uncle George was the 2nd Earl of Belvedere. Similarities have been noted between Hammerwood and Belvedere House, a Palladian villa built in 1740 as a hunting lodge above Lough Ennell. Both are set on rising ground, with views across water, are visually imposing compared to their size, and have relatively narrow, horizontal footprints. The Rochfort connection would prove decisive for the estate's future.

Sperling decided to commission a new house at the Bower, naming it Hammerwood Lodge, after the surrounding woodland, Hammer Wood: a reference to the iron forge which had existed in the area since the Middle Ages.

=== 1790s: design and construction ===
ΤΗϹ ΤΟΥ ΙΩΑΝΝΟΥ ϹΠΕΡΛΙΝΓΟΥ ΕΠΑΥΛΕΩϹ ΠΡΟϹΤΥΛΗ ΠΡΩΤΗ. ΑΡΧΙΤΕΚΤΩΝ ΛΑΤΡΩΒΕ. ΕΠΟΙΕ ΤΟΝ ΑΨϞΒ ΕΝΕΑΥΤΟΝ ΙΗϹΟΥ ΧΡΙϹΤΟΥ ΚΑΙ ΤΟΝ ΔΕΥΤΕΡΟΝ ΤΗϹ ΧΜΒ ΟΛΥΜΠΙΑΔΑϹ.

Of John Sperling's cattlefold
the architect Latrobe built the first portico
in the year 1792 AD and
the second year of the 642nd Olympiad.

— Translated from the Ancient Greek inscription situated on the reverse of a Coade stone abacus block of a column on the west portico.

In c. late 1791 or early 1792, Sperling is recorded by Christian Ignatius Latrobe as visiting the architect Benjamin Henry Latrobe, Christian's brother, at his home in London. At c. 27, Latrobe, who was at that time a pupil of S. P. Cockerell, was a year younger than Sperling. He commissioned Latrobe to design and build a new country house on the site of the Bower. Latrobe had previously worked on country house re-modellings, including at Daylesford, but this was his first independent commission.

Works began in 1792, as denoted by the house's Greek inscription which, in dating its construction in Olympiads and naming the architect, is unique in Britain.

Because of the loss of Latrobe's papers during his 1795 emigration, little is known of the details of the house's construction. Trinder describes Hammerwood's form as comprising "a large, Palladian central block (corps de logis) accentuated by a giant order of shallow pilasters flanked by low arcaded wings terminated in tetrastyle porticoes, while an asymmetric service wing stretches toward the northeast, hidden behind the bulk of the house."

Latrobe's use of Greek orders in the design was advanced and unorthodox. For the central portico, he employed a modified version of the Ionic order and antae (pilasters) of the Erechtheum at Athens, with the columns left unfluted and the antae capitals simplified. The end pavilions are bold, Doric temples, influenced by the temples at Paestum, which Latrobe may have witnessed during a visit to Naples, and at Delos, the mythological birthplace of Apollo.

Whereas the original Paestum Doric order had fully fluted column shafts, Latrobe's column shafts are fluted only at the base and the top, above the necking band. The capitals are made in Coade stone. These partially fluted, or "unfinished," column shafts appear to derive from the Doric Temple of Apollo at Delos, as discovered by Julien-David Le Roy. Behind the Doric columns, at the corners of the small temples, Latrobe used the bold and primitive anta order of the Paestum temple, with its flaring, cavetto-like capital, as published by Thomas Major.

Pevsner observed that the columns were "patently inspired by the then very recent work of such men as Ledoux and Brongniart", and described Hammerwood as "a demonstration of primeval force".

Coadeware plaques of scenes derived from the 1st century BC Borghese Vase, a Pentelic marble krater housed in the Louvre depicting a festive Dionysian procession (thiasus), adorn the naoi of both porticoes. The eastern plaque shows a drunken male figure, often identified as the satyr Silenus, stumbling as he drops or reaches for a spilled flagon of wine; the western plaque shows another part of the procession, with figures playing the kithara, aulos and crotales.

During the construction of Hammerwood, Latrobe was commissioned by John Trayton Fuller (1743–1811), a cousin of Mad Jack Fuller, to build Ashdown House, 2 miles (3.2 km) south of Hammerwood, their proximity allowing for the sharing of craftsmen and suppliers, and for Latrobe to supervise construction concurrently. Like Hammerwood, Latrobe's Ashdown was an addition to, and incorporated parts of, an earlier Tudor house, Lavertye. Snadon and Fazio observe that Latrobe gave the two houses contrasting characters and genders: Hammerwood's bold, Doric emphasis expressed a masculine, rustic hunting lodge, while Ashdown's solely Ionic order, adapted from the Erechtheum, gave that house a more domestic character considered appropriate to its year-round family use – a distinction Latrobe appears to have drawn from Vitruvius's characterization of the two orders.

American architectural historian Talbot Hamlin observed that Hammerwood:

reveals a basic desire to tear open the usual conventions of eighteenth-century country-house design, to use new forms and old forms strangely, to create drama—almost wonder—for the observer. In places it harks back to the stark power of Vanbrugh; in others it looks forward to the Greek Revival.

For John Harris, Latrobe's use of the Doric order at Hammerwood:

elevates [him] to the rank of the very first of British architects, not even subservient to Sir John Soane.

Writing in the Oxford Dictionary of Architecture and Landscape Architecture, James Stevens Curl wrote that Hammerwood and Ashdown are:

two of the most remarkable houses for their date in the British Isles, and show Latrobe to have been in the vanguard of Neo-Classicism, far more adventurous than any of his better-known contemporaries in England.

Latrobe treated interior, exterior, and setting as an integrated whole, designing not only the house and its landscape, but also its furniture. This anticipates his later work in the United States, including at the White House. Surviving Latrobe furniture is now held in the Metropolitan Museum of Art and the Philadelphia Museum of Art, but the whereabouts of the Hammerwood furniture is not known.

In 1795, due to problems in obtaining payment for another project, Latrobe was faced with severe financial problems. When his wife, Lydia Sellon, died in childbirth in November 1793, he is thought to have suffered a breakdown. Declared bankrupt and unable to pay some of his workmen, he emigrated to America on 25 November 1795.

In the 1790s, the Sperlings had become the principal investors – alongside Harriet's family – in a new Dublin distillery business, Edmund Grange & Co. However, the venture was undone by the union of Britain and Ireland in 1800. Large Irish distillers lost the tax advantages they had enjoyed, and the expected removal of import tariffs on Irish spirits did not happen; instead, the Government introduced duties to offset the higher taxes paid by British distillers. The artist and diarist Joseph Farington wrote that the partners 'overbuilt themselves at a vast expense', and reported that the Sperlings lost £70,000 (equivalent to £7,280,620 in 2025) – by far the largest sum of any of the investors.

By 1803, Sperling was compelled to give up both Hammerwood, by now a 510-acre (210 ha) estate, and his London house at 34 Devonshire Place, and to move back to Essex.

=== 1803–1918: Victorian estate ===
In 1803, Hammerwood was purchased by Magens Dorrien Magens (1761–1849), a London merchant banker who had sat as a Tory MP for Carmarthen for just six months in 1796; he was unseated after his opponent lodged a successful election petition. He would later sit for Ludgershall, a rotten borough in Wiltshire, from 1804 to 1812. Upon his death at Hammerwood in May 1849, aged 87, he left Hammerwood to his son, John Dorrien Magens, who as chairman of the board of the East Grinstead Railway Company (EGR) was responsible for the connection of East Grinstead to the railway system at Three Bridges in 1855. It is likely that extensions to the house, specifically to the north-east service wing, took place under the ownership of the Dorrien Magens family, and census records from the 1840s indicate at least ten indoor staff during the period.

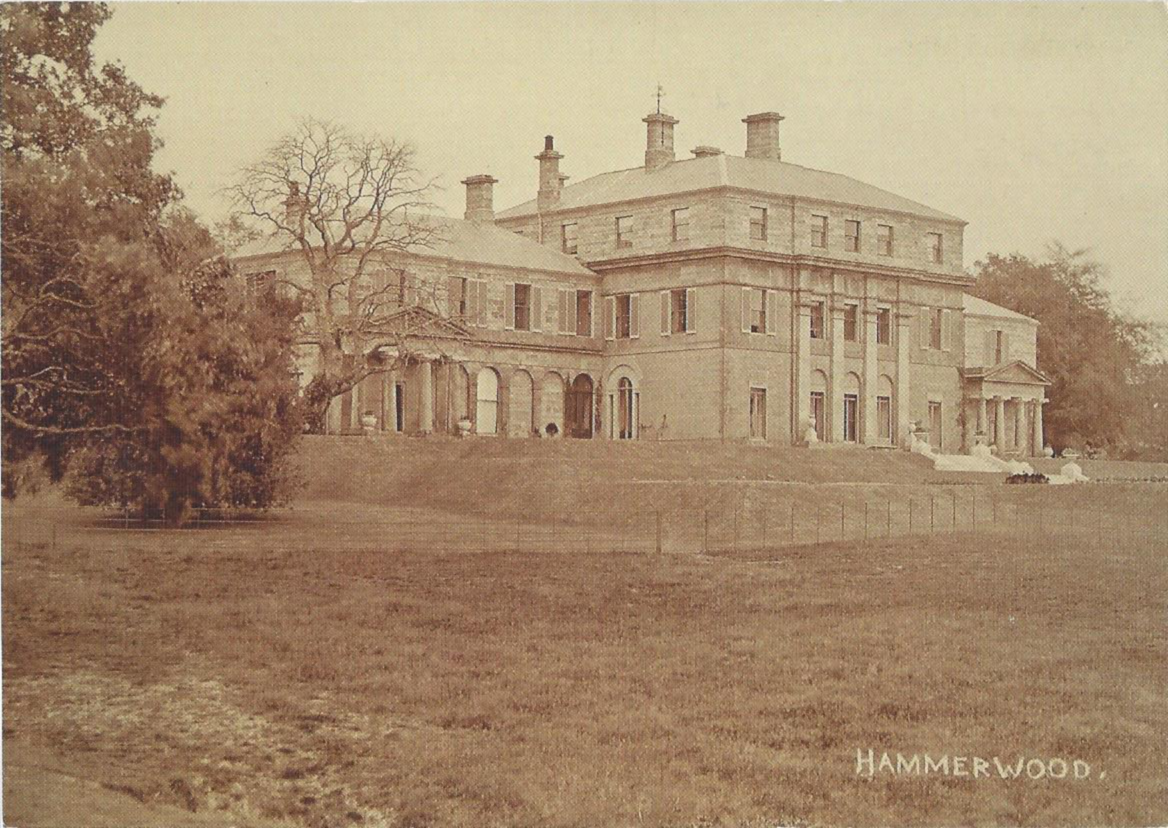
Hammerwood Lodge after the Teulon alterations, c. late 19th century or early 20th century

John Dorrien Magens sold Hammerwood to Oswald Augustus Smith (1826–1902; of Smith's Bank, later part of NatWest) in June 1864 for £37,250 (equivalent to £4,091,989 in 2025), of which £10,000 was for the timber. In 1865, the Smiths engaged S. S. Teulon with the intention of remodelling the house to their taste. Amongst other more subtle changes to the building, Teulon raised the attic over the central block to create a low third floor, whilst preserving Latrobe's façade. Work began on 8 May 1865; scholars Snadon and Fazio aver that "Teulon integrated his additions so carefully with the existing fabric that it is difficult at first glance to discern them."

Maintaining the 2,510-acre (1,020 ha) estate of parkland, arable farmland and woods, Smith also installed a gas system for the lighting of the house, and fully insulated the newly raised roof. The Smiths were also considerable local philanthropists. An 1893 article described the estate under Smith as a largely self-contained community, referring to Hammerwood as "the centre of a little kingdom" of which Smith was "the reigning monarch," noting its own workers' housing, school, and church.

First paying for a Chapel of Ease for the three local parishes of East Grinstead, Forest Row and Hartfield, in 1873, the Smiths commissioned Richard Norman Shaw to design a village school and chapel for 100 children, as well as Bower Cottages (Grade II listed); in 1875 for the Vicarage; and in 1880 for St Stephen's Church, Hammerwood, to the design of E. P. Loftus Brock (Grade II*). In 1892, Oswald Augustus provided for the rebuilding of St Peter's Church, Holtye, in memory of his late wife (Rose Sophia Vansittart, 1832–1892); in 1893 for the rebuilding of the Countess of Thanet's Almshouses on Holtye Common, and at the end of the 19th century for a new building for the Queen Victoria Hospital in East Grinstead.

Oswald Augustus died at Hammerwood in August 1902. His son and heir, Basil Oswald Smith (1861–1928), soon put it up for sale, and on 1 October 1903 it was sold to the Revd George Ferris Whidborne (1845–1910), an Evangelical churchman and palaeontologist, for £63,570 (equivalent to £6,682,938 in 2025). He died in February 1910, leaving his wife Margaret (1868–1944) to bring up seven children on her own, and forcing her to mortgage and let out the house. Their eldest son George Ferris Whidborne (1890–1915) was killed in the First World War; all three sons were at different times awarded the MC.

=== 1918–1982: decline and dereliction ===
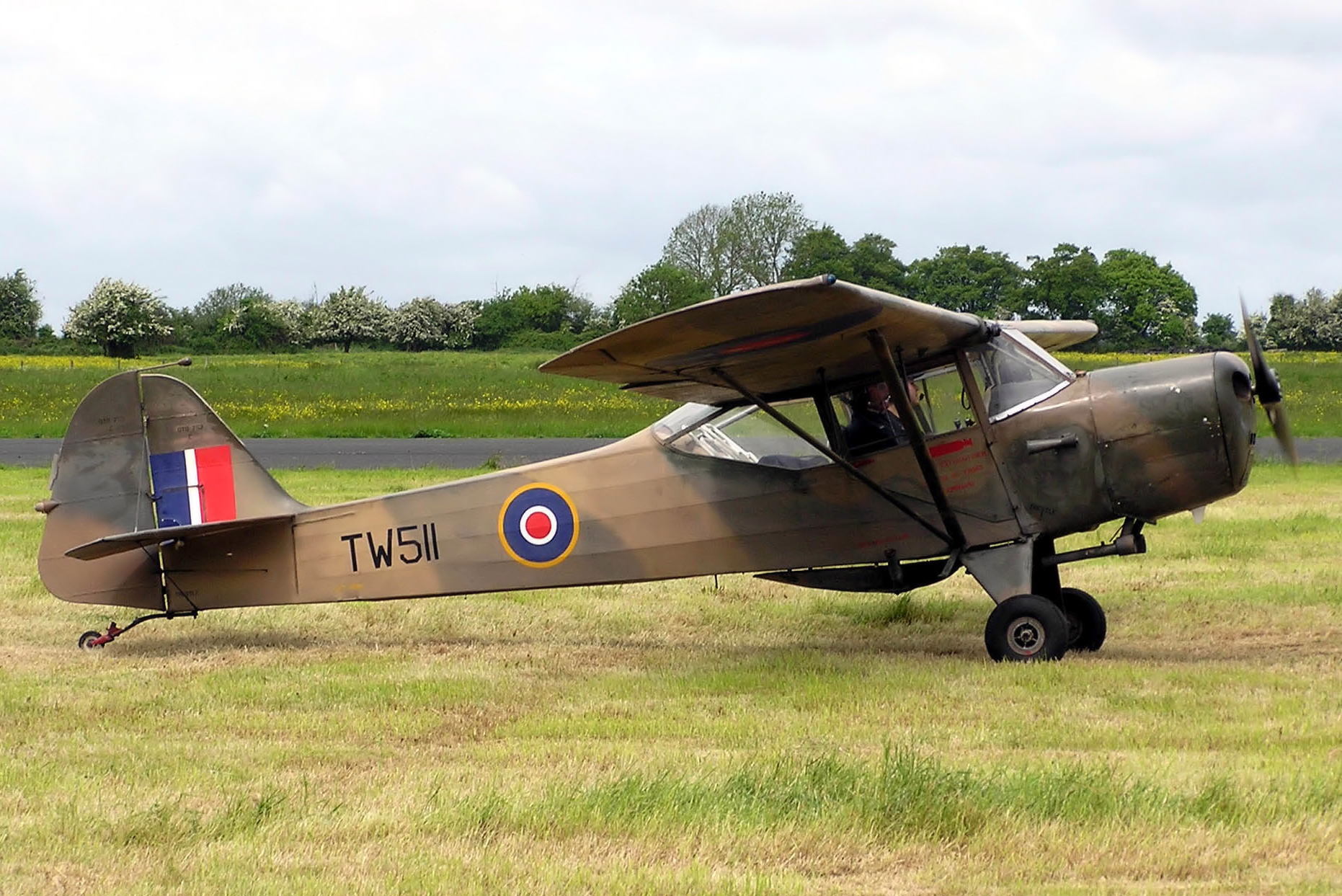
A postwar Auster Mk V, of the type based at Hammerwood from November 1943, in wartime colours

In 1918, double death duties compelled Margaret Whidborne to sell almost one third of the estate, 843 acres (341 ha). In 1919, St Andrew's School, a prep school in Tunbridge Wells which the Whidborne children had attended, burnt down. St Andrew's moved to Hammerwood whilst new premises were found in Forest Row. Old boys remembered playing cricket against Ashdown House, by now also a prep school, on the lawn at Hammerwood.

Two years later, two floors of servants' quarters on the north-east service wing which had been added by Teulon in 1865 were demolished, and the estate was once again put up for sale. In 1921, Margaret Whidborne sold the Hammerwood estate to Arthur Harper Bond for £32,671 1s. 5d. (equivalent to £1,382,770 in 2025).

Bond broke up the estate, now known as Hammerwood Park, selling the house and 258 acres (104 ha) of park and woodland to Lt. Col. Stephen Hungerford Pollen CMG (1868–1935) in January 1923, and the remaining 1,407 acres (569 ha) of farms separately. The house's place as a focal point of local life began to decline.

Pollen had been ADC to Lords Lansdowne and Elgin, respective Viceroys of India, winning medals for service in that country and South Africa, and serving in the Tirah Expedition in 1897. He was later the chairman of British Aluminium. His family were the first residents to enjoy an electricity supply and water from the mains. There remained a full complement of twelve indoor staff for the duration of the Pollens' time at Hammerwood, and they contributed the land, and a quarter of the costs, for the building of the Hammerwood and Holtye Village Hall.

After Lt. Col. Pollen's death in March 1935, the house was sold to Harold Kirwan-Taylor (1895–1981), a surgeon, and his wife, Elizabeth. Like many large houses, Hammerwood was requisitioned for use by the armed forces during the Second World War, becoming home to 200 soldiers, including the cricketer Denis Compton, and a contingent from the Canadian Army. No. 660 Squadron RAF operated from an airstrip to the north of the park from November 1943, and the SOE flew Westland Lysanders from the same strip for a time.

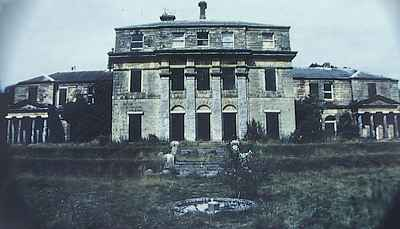
Hammerwood became derelict in the late 20th century, and was boarded up in 1976. View from the south, 1982

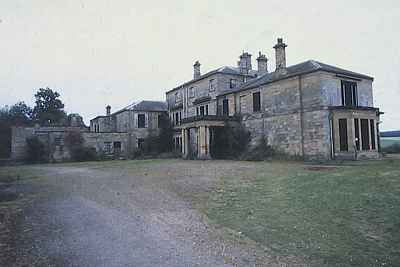
View from the north, 1982

After the war, heavy taxation, a shortage of staff and ongoing rationing meant that country houses were now extremely difficult to sustain. In 1946, the Kirwan-Taylors divorced, and Hammerwood was put up for sale in May 1947. It was bought in August 1947 by James Chattell, who divided the house into eleven apartments, and further broke up what remained of the estate. However, by the 1960s, dry and wet rot became increasingly problematic and the house uninhabitable; its listed building description, written after a visit in November 1953, noted that it was 'empty and boarded up'. The estate subsequently passed to Arthur Chattell and, in January 1970, to Malcolm Chattell.

In August 1973, Led Zeppelin bought Hammerwood at auction, intending to turn it into a recording studio and flats. Initially purchased by an associated company, Superhype Tapes Ltd, the house was passed to Woodhammer (Nominees) Ltd in February 1975. Although it served as a location for The Song Remains the Same, plans did not progress. Amidst significant vandalism, three tonnes of lead was removed from the roof, compromising it in fourteen places and allowing thousands of gallons of water to flow into the structure. The progression of the rot accelerated as rooves and ceilings collapsed. Hammerwood was boarded up in 1976, and put up for sale in 1978.

=== 1982–present: restoration ===
Having been for sale for four years, the house was advertised in Country Life in June 1982, by this time in a very poor condition and including c. 20 acres (8.1 ha) of overgrown gardens. In July 1982, it was purchased by David Pinnegar (b. 1961), with the intention of restoring and opening it to visitors, and much of the early restoration work was undertaken together with his parents, Eileen and John Pinnegar. The house opened to the public in April 1983.

The restoration, much of which was undertaken by volunteers, won the Anne de Amodio award from the International Burgen Institute (now part of Europa Nostra) in 1984, and a silver medal from the Société d'Encouragement au Progrès in Paris in 1987. Except for a modest contribution by English Heritage and the Department of the Environment, private ownership restricted access to heritage grants; the restoration was instead funded almost solely by visitors, costing more than £140,000 between 1982 and 1989, making it one of the largest private restoration projects in Europe at the time. In his England's Thousand Best Houses (2003), Simon Jenkins would describe Mr Pinnegar as 'one of those eccentrics without whom half the houses in England would have vanished'.

In 1984, the house was given a rare copy of the Parthenon Frieze made by D. Brucciani & Co., which is displayed in the old kitchens, now known as the Elgin Room. The Great Storm of 1987 caused considerable damage. No. 656 Squadron AAC assisted in a delivery of new roof lead in 1988 using a Westland Lynx helicopter, in an operation covered by Blue Peter. Works continued into the new millennium and a programme of rolling restoration is ongoing.

== Hammerwood today ==
The house and gardens have been open to the public since April 1983. A musical instrument collection is used for an annual programme of concerts, and the keyboards are tuned to an unequal temperament, upon which composers of the Classical and Romantic eras relied.

Cheryl Cole in interview with Steve Jones at Hammerwood during the filming of her music video for The Flood

Hammerwood has been used extensively as a location for TV, feature films, fashion and photography, including for Knife Edge (2009), starring Joan Plowright; London Boulevard (2010), starring Colin Farrell and Keira Knightley; and work by Led Zeppelin; The Darkness; Victoria Beckham; Melanie C and Cheryl Cole. It has been used for fashion shoots and photography for Prada; John Lewis; Tim Walker for Vogue; and Country Life. It was used as the setting for the 1998 narcotics documentary Sacred Weeds.

In 2018, Hammerwood was the setting for Beyoncé's September cover shoot for Vogue, photographed by Tyler Mitchell, the first black photographer to shoot a cover in the magazine's history. A portrait from the shoot was later acquired by the Smithsonian's National Portrait Gallery.

In 2024, the house passed to Edward Pinnegar (b. 1996), and his wife, Sophie, marking the third generation of the family since its 1982 rescue.

== Park and gardens ==
Hammerwood sits in Picturesque landscaped parkland, on a south-facing hill, with extensive views from the south-west to the south-east, its own southern façade looking across the valley to a stream where the iron forge which gave the estate its name once sat. A serpentine lake, artificially dammed from this stream as part of the 1790s landscaping, sits at the bottom of the valley with open parkland on either side; views of distant hills continue for two or three miles beyond.

The prospect was clearly attractive to John Sperling: Latrobe's brother, Christian Ignatius, wrote in his diary on 24 October 1792 that:

Mr. Sperling took me all round and across the woods to explain his intended plan of improvement. Nature has done a great deal for him. He has low and high woods, hills, vales, runs of water, springs &. but a little assistance from art is wanting to render this as delicious a Spot as any in the Kingdom.

Fazio and Snadon note Latrobe's 1794 reference to a 'very intimate' acquaintance with Humphry Repton (1752–1818), the English landscape designer, and suggest that many features of Hammerwood's landscape, including unobstructed views to the south which extend far further than the 1792 boundaries of the estate, align with Repton's ideas. Ring counts of oaks felled by the Great Storm of 1987 dated them to 1793 and 1796.

Formal terraces and informal ornamental gardens were made up in the 19th and 20th centuries, initially replacing the former sweep of parkland up to the frontage of the house shown on maps up to 1841. Oswald Augustus Smith, Hammerwood's owner from 1864 to 1902, was responsible for laying out the ornamental gardens to the east of the house. As the cousin of Augustus Smith, Lord Proprietor of the Isles of Scilly and the founder of Tresco Abbey Gardens, where rhododendrons feature in the planting, he introduced them to Hammerwood and they remain today.

The Smiths planted the gardens with specimen trees and made up gravel paths through the bushes, shrubberies and woodland to the east. In 1927, a Yew Garden was introduced below the south terrace, since restored. Until the mid-20th century, the parkland on the valley slopes to the south of the lake was partially wooded; it was later partly cleared for arable cultivation, but is now being restored. A few scattered trees remain from the extensive pattern shown established on the map of 1808.

During the period of dereliction, the gardens, including kitchen gardens and greenhouses to the north, became severely overgrown, and the parkland was used for grazing and arable cultivation. Much of the ornamental garden to the south and east has since been restored and replanted, with work undertaken by volunteers from the National Trust Activities Group (NTAG) and the London Wildlife Trust; and, in the replanting of trees, by the Stanley Smith Horticultural Trust, the Men of the Trees, the Countryside Commission and the South East Electricity Board after the Great Storm of 1987. Forming part of the High Weald National Landscape since October 1983, the parkland and gardens were given Grade II listed status in 1987.

== Entrances and approaches ==
As part of the landscaping undertaken by Sperling and Latrobe in the 1790s, a long, winding drive extending from Ashurst Wood which approached the house from the south was laid. In his study of Hammerwood, Trinder suggests that from the perspective created by this approach the pilasters on the central block create an optical illusion which leads the house to look larger than it is due to the inclusion of temple fronts on the wings. He describes the joint endeavours of Sperling and Latrobe as "a collective ego trip on a small budget ... the house, although of modest size for the time, is designed to look huge."

From the mid-19th century, coinciding with John Dorrien Magens's development of the railway from East Grinstead, the southerly approach became less oft used: the route from the railway town became more practical, via the East Grinstead–Tunbridge Wells road (now the A264), and the lane thence through the village of Hammerwood.

The southerly approach fell almost entirely out of use as the house became derelict, and some of it was given over to farmland in the 20th century. The former entrance lodge, known as Dog Gate Lodge (coordinates: 51°07′24″N 0°02′58″E), survives, as does the bridge which carries the drive over the feeder channel for the lake at the foot of the valley, at the site of the 17th century iron forge. The road leading east out of Ashurst Wood (now a dead end) is still called Hammerwood Road. There were also two secondary entrance drives to the house, from the north-west and north-east, now disused but shown on the tithe map of 1841.

== See also ==
- Benjamin Henry Latrobe
- List of works by Benjamin Henry Latrobe
- Ashdown House
- Greek Revival architecture
- Greek Revival architecture in North America
- Federal architecture
- United States Capitol and White House
- Coade stone
- English country house
- Destruction of country houses in 20th-century Britain
