= All Saints Church, Heathfield =

All Saints Church
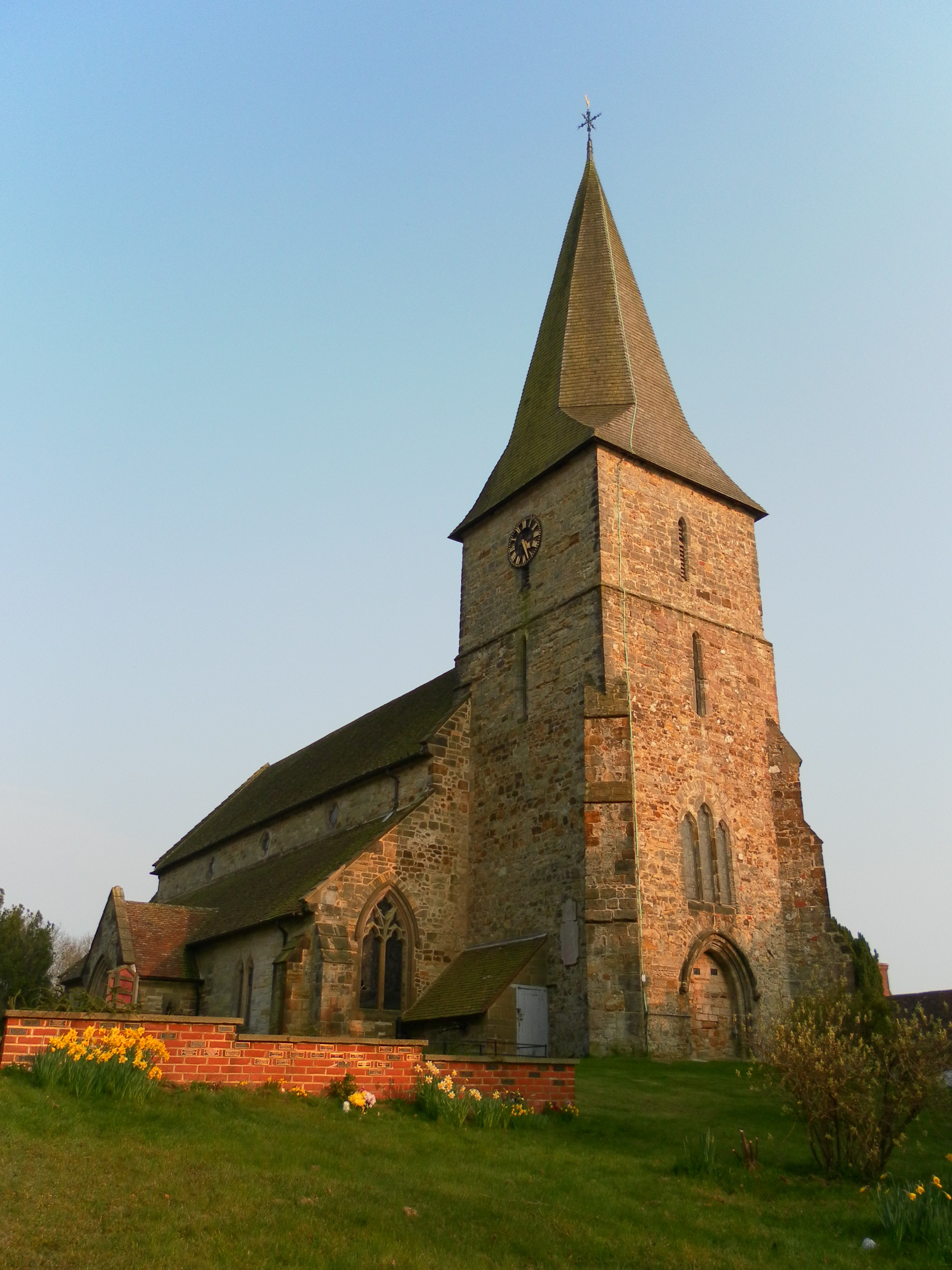
- All Saints Church
- 50°57′36″N 0°16′30″E
- OS grid reference: TQ 59856 20294
- Location: Heathfield, East Sussex
- Country: England
- Denomination: Church of England
- Previous denomination: Roman Catholic Church

History
- Status: Open

Architecture
- Functional status: Open
- Heritage designation: Grade II*
- Years built: 14th Century

All Saints Church is a Church of England parish church in Heathfield, East Sussex, England. It was constructed in the 14th century and is a Grade II* listed building.

== History ==
The church was built in the 14th century on the location of a former church, with the 13th-century tower being incorporated into the new church. Stonemasons working on the church built a pub next door to act as their shelter when they were working on it.

In the early 1600s, the vicar of the church was Reverend Robert Hunt. He was not popular with the local parishioners owing to him not living in the parish, as well as being accused of sexual impropriety with his maid. Despite being acquitted, the Archbishop of Canterbury recommended he go to the Colony of Virginia. He landed in Jamestown and conducted the first Church of England service in the colony. A stained glass window commemorating this event was installed in All Saints in 1957.

The church was expanded in 1823 with the addition of two side galleries with a capacity of 120, paid for by the Incorporated Society for the Enlargement of Churches. It was restored in 1861 and in 1872 by an architect called J. Billing. In 1917, a stained glass window to Lt-Colonel W. C. C. Ash in suffragette colours was installed after a contribution from one of his close female relatives in the north aisle. It was granted Grade II* listed status in 1966.

== Churchyard ==
The churchyard contains a crypt which also dated back to the 14th century when the church was constructed. The church has occasionally received grants from Heathfield and Waldron Parish Council. It contains 19 military graves managed by the Commonwealth War Graves Commission.

== See also ==
- Media related to All Saints Church, Old Heathfield at Wikimedia Commons
- Grade II* listed buildings in Wealden
- List of current places of worship in Wealden
