= Magens Dorrien Magens =

Magens Dorrien Magens (c. December 1761 – 30 May 1849) of Hammerwood Lodge, East Sussex, was an English banker, Member of Parliament and author. In early life he was known as Magens Dorrien. He adopted the surname of his uncle Nicholas Magens by special licence on 16 December 1788, after his marriage.

He was born the third son of John Dorrien (-1784), a merchant banker, originally from Hamburg, and East India Company director of London and Great Berkhamstead, Hertfordshire. In 1788 Dorrien (as he still was) married the Hon. Henrietta Cecilia Rice (1758–1829), a daughter of George Rice and Cecil de Cardonnel, 2nd Baroness Dynevor. Their children were Cecilia, George William, Maria, and Anne Frances.

The bank in which he was a partner, having inherited a lump sum and an estate at Brightlingsea from his aunt (1712-1779) and uncle Nicholas Magens, was called Magens, Dorrien, and Magens. By 1798 it was Dorrien, Magens, Mello, Martin, and Harrison, and later changed its name to Dorrien, Magens, Mello, and Company. In 1798 the firm sent some silver bullion to the Royal Mint to be coined into shillings, resulting in the rare "Dorrien and Magens shilling" of 1798. He was also Deputy Chairman, and later Chairman, of the Rock Life Assurance Company. His brother George was director of the Bank of England.

A Tory, Magens was elected to Parliament for Carmarthen in May 1796 but was unseated the following November following an election petition. He was a Member of Parliament for Ludgershall in Wiltshire from 1804 to 1812. Re-elected for Ludgershall in 1812, in December of that year he became Steward of the Manor of East Hendred, a notional "office of profit under the Crown" which was used as a device for resigning from the House of Commons.

Magens died at Hammerwood Park in 1849, aged 87.

== Publications ==
- Magens Dorrien Magens, Esq., An Inquiry into the Real Difference between Actual Money and Paper Money; Also an Examination into the Constitution of Banks (London, 1804)
- Thoughts Upon a New Coinage of Silver, More Especially as It Relates to an Alteration in the Division of the Pound Troy; by a Banker (new edition by Gale Ecco, 2010)
