= Violet Gordon-Woodhouse =

British keyboard player (1872–1948)

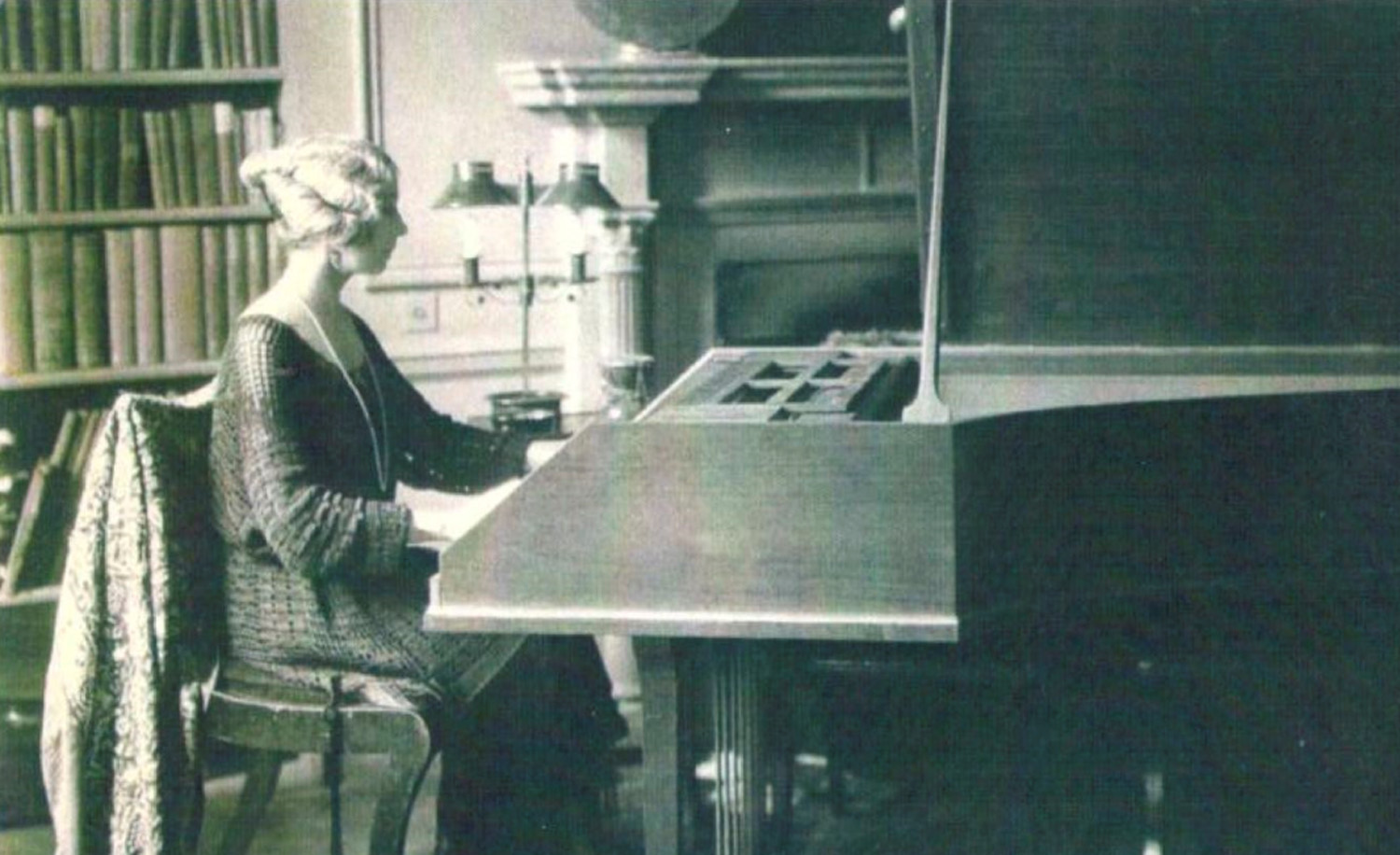
- Gordon-Woodhouse, circa 1900
- Born: Violet Kate Eglinton Gwynne; April 23, 1872; London, England
- Died: January 9, 1948 (aged 75)
- Resting place: Church of St Peter ad Vincula, Folkington
- Occupations: harpsichordist, clavichordist
- Spouse: Gordon Woodhouse (m. 1895)

Violet Gordon-Woodhouse (23 April 1872 – 9 January 1948) was a British keyboard player. She specialised in the harpsichord and clavichord, and was influential in bringing both instruments back into fashion. She was the first person to record the harpsichord, and the first to broadcast harpsichord music.

== Family ==
Violet Kate Eglinton Gwynne was born on 23 April 1872, at 97 Harley Street, St Marylebone, London, into a wealthy family with an estate in Sussex, England. She was the second daughter and fourth of seven children of James Eglinton Anderson Gwynne (1832–1915), an engineer, inventor, and landowner, and Mary Earle Purvis (1841–1923). Her mother, who was known as May, was an intimate friend of soprano Adelina Patti.

Violet's maternal grandfather, Royal Navy officer and merchant William Purvis (1796–1854) from Dalgety Bay, Scotland, married Cornelia Louisa Intveld (1808–1857) in 1822. Intveld was a noted soprano and a great beauty of her era. Upon glimpsing her across the auditorium at the opera in London, King William IV sent his equerry to invite her to his box. When she refused, the King sent the equerry back just to ask her name. Cornelia Louisa Intveld was born in Padang where her father, who came from humble beginnings in Hellevoetsluis, South Holland, rose up through the Dutch East India Company to become the Dutch Resident of Padang. Her maternal grandmother was an Ono Niha ranee (a term that covered every rank from chieftain's daughter to princess) who married a prominent Dutch colonial official and merchant. This "foreign blood" caused opposition to Violet Gordon-Woodhouse's father's family to her parents' marriage and so they eloped.

Violet was the sister of Rupert Gwynne, MP for Eastbourne from 1910–24, and Roland Gwynne, Mayor of Eastbourne from 1929–31. She was the aunt of the cookery writer Elizabeth David.

Violet broke off an engagement to a wealthy Sussex neighbour, Viscount Gage, after human sexuality was explained to her. In 1895, she entered into a mariage blanc with Gordon Woodhouse. She persuaded her husband to adopt the hyphenated surname Gordon-Woodhouse. His reasons for entering into the marriage are unclear. In 1899, William Barrington (heir to a viscountcy) moved into the marital house, joined later by Max Labouchere and Dennis Tollemache. This arrangement was referred to in society circles as the "Woodhouse circus".

== Career ==
Violet's musical ability was enthusiastically encouraged by her mother from an early age and, by the age of 16, she was among the most promising pupils of Oscar Beringer, a German émigré who was the country's leading piano teacher. Originally playing the piano, Violet rose to fame playing the harpsichord and clavichord. An important influence on her was Arnold Dolmetsch, a pioneer of the early music revival, who began making copies of old keyboard instruments in the 1890s. Dolmetsch supplied Violet with instruments and gave her instruction on how to play them. In 1899, Violet performed Bach's Concerto for Three Harpsichords in C at a public concert in London. The other two harpsichordists in the Bach were Elodie Desirée (the second Mrs Dolmetsch) and Dolmetsch himself. Dolmetsch worked abroad in the early-20th century, but Violet resumed her collaboration with him in 1910.

As well as early music repertoire, Violet played music by nineteenth century composers and living composers such as Delius, who dedicated a harpsichord piece to her.

== Later years ==
After the First World War, Violet, who did not receive anything in her father's will, found herself relatively short of money. This may have been a factor in her deciding to sign a recording contract.

By the 1920s, Violet and Gordon acquired Nether Lypiatt Manor in Gloucestershire, where they lived with Barrington (known as "Bill"). Finances improved after Gordon received an inheritance in 1926. Violet reduced her public performances.

In the 1930s, she taught the Australian keyboard player Valda Aveling.

After Violet's death in 1948, aged 75, the two men remained at Nether Lypiatt until 1951, when Gordon died. She lies in the churchyard of The Church of St Peter ad Vincula, Folkington, near Eastbourne, East Sussex. A plaque to her memory and achievements can also be found on the left-hand wall inside the church. An obituary was published on 12 January 1948.

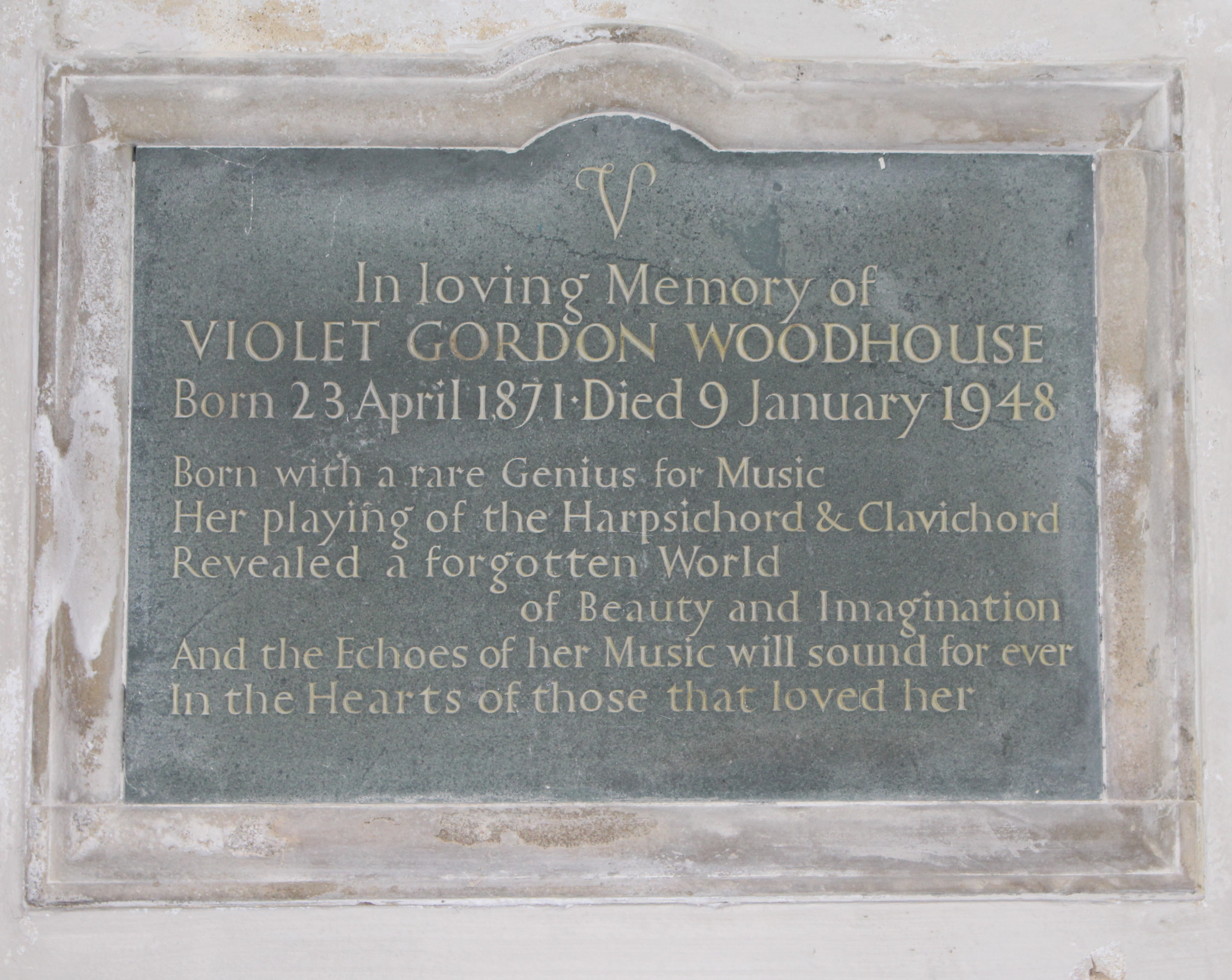
The memorial to Violet Gordon-Woodhouse on the wall of the church of St Peter ad Vincula, Folkington, East Sussex.

== In popular culture ==
She was close to many of the leading artists of her day, including Dame Ethel Smyth, Siegfried Sassoon, Irene, Lady Dean Paul (also known as Poldowski), and George Bernard Shaw. Welsh tramp poet W. H. Davies often visited her harpsichord recitals and also dined, with the Sitwells, at Nether Lypiatt.

- Sir Osbert Sitwell mentions her often in his autobiography.
- Radclyffe Hall, the lesbian novelist, dedicated a book of erotic poems to her.
- Roger Fry is quoted in his biography by Virginia Woolf as saying, "'that remarkable artist Mrs Woodhouse' playing Bach…'almost persuades me to be a Christian'"
- Roger Scruton wrote the libretto and music for an opera, Violet, based on her life, which premiered in 2005 at the Guildhall School of Music and Drama.

== Discography ==
=== Harpsichord ===
Gordon-Woodhouse is claimed to be the first person recorded playing the harpsichord in 1920. Some of her recordings have been released on CD. The composers featured include J.S. Bach.

=== Clavichord ===
Violet also made clavichord recordings, but she was not the first person to record the instrument, an honour that appears to belong to Arnold Dolmetsch.

== See also ==
- Contemporary harpsichord
