= Bolebroke Castle Miniature Railway =

Coordinates: 51°07′10″N 0°06′24″E

The Bolebroke Castle Miniature Railway or Bolebroke Castle and Lakes Railway (often abbreviated to BC&LR) was a 7 1/4 inches (180 mm) railway that ran within the grounds of Bolebroke Castle. The railway was approximately 2 1/2 miles (4.0 km) in length, however, only parts of the railway were open freely to the public. The railway closed in 2012 after the owner died and the stock/track was distributed to volunteers and new owners.
