= Copping Hall =

House in Uckfield, East Sussex, England

Coordinates: 50°58′25″N 0°05′43″E

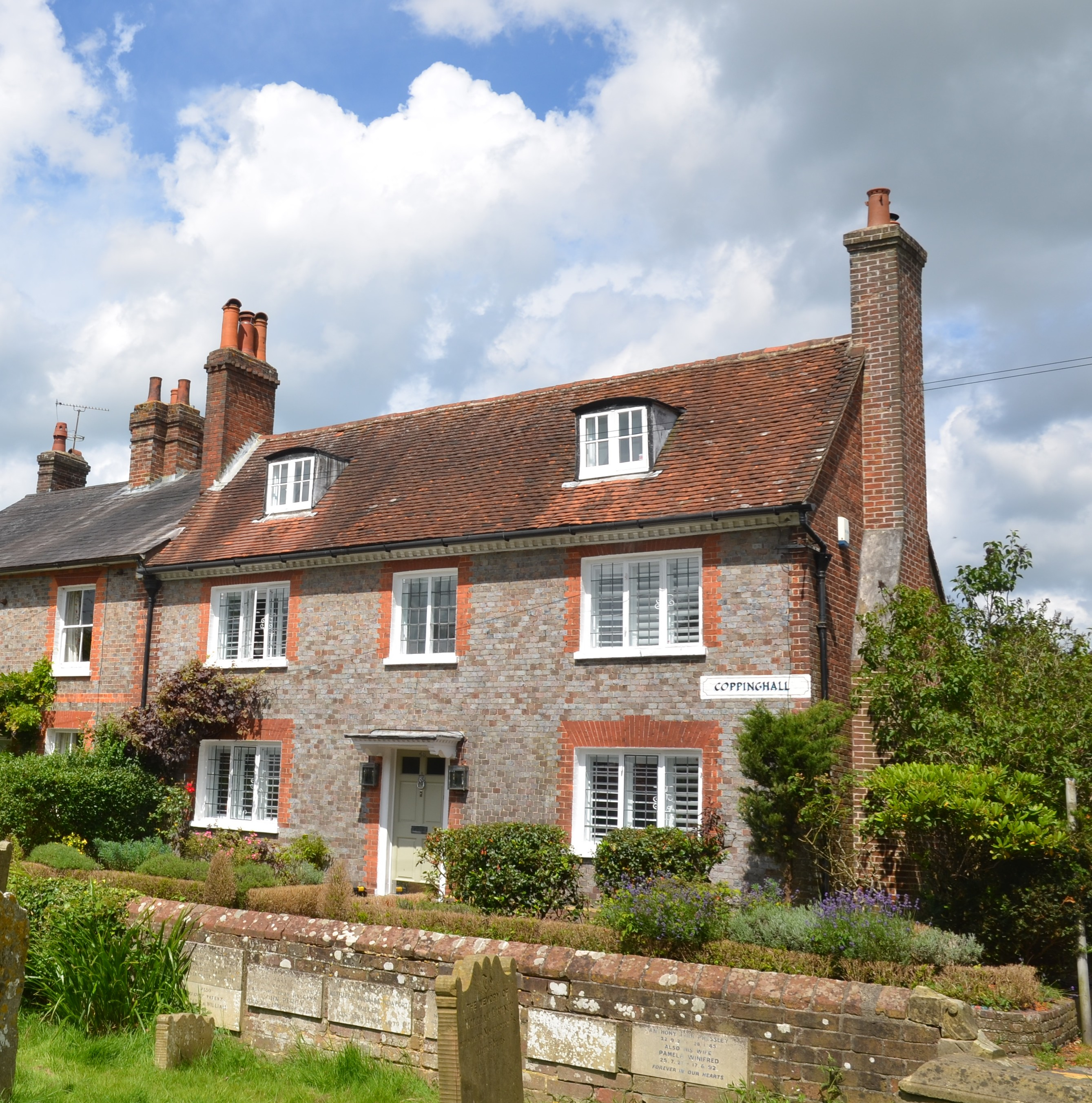

Copping Hall is a Grade II* listed house in Uckfield, East Sussex, England. It is located at 46 Church Lane, Uckfield, East Sussex TN22 1BT. Built in the eighteenth century, it is two-storey high and contains an attic, three windows and two dormers as well as grey headers with red brick dressings and quoins. It also has a dentilled cornice, a tiled roof, and casement windows with small square panes. Moreover, there is a doorway with flat hood on brackets and door of six fielded panels.

It was listed as Grade II* by English Heritage on 26 November 1953.

== See also ==
- Grade II* listed buildings in Wealden
