= Church of St Peter ad Vincula, Folkington =

Coordinates: 50.8128°N 0.2121°E

St. Peter's Church
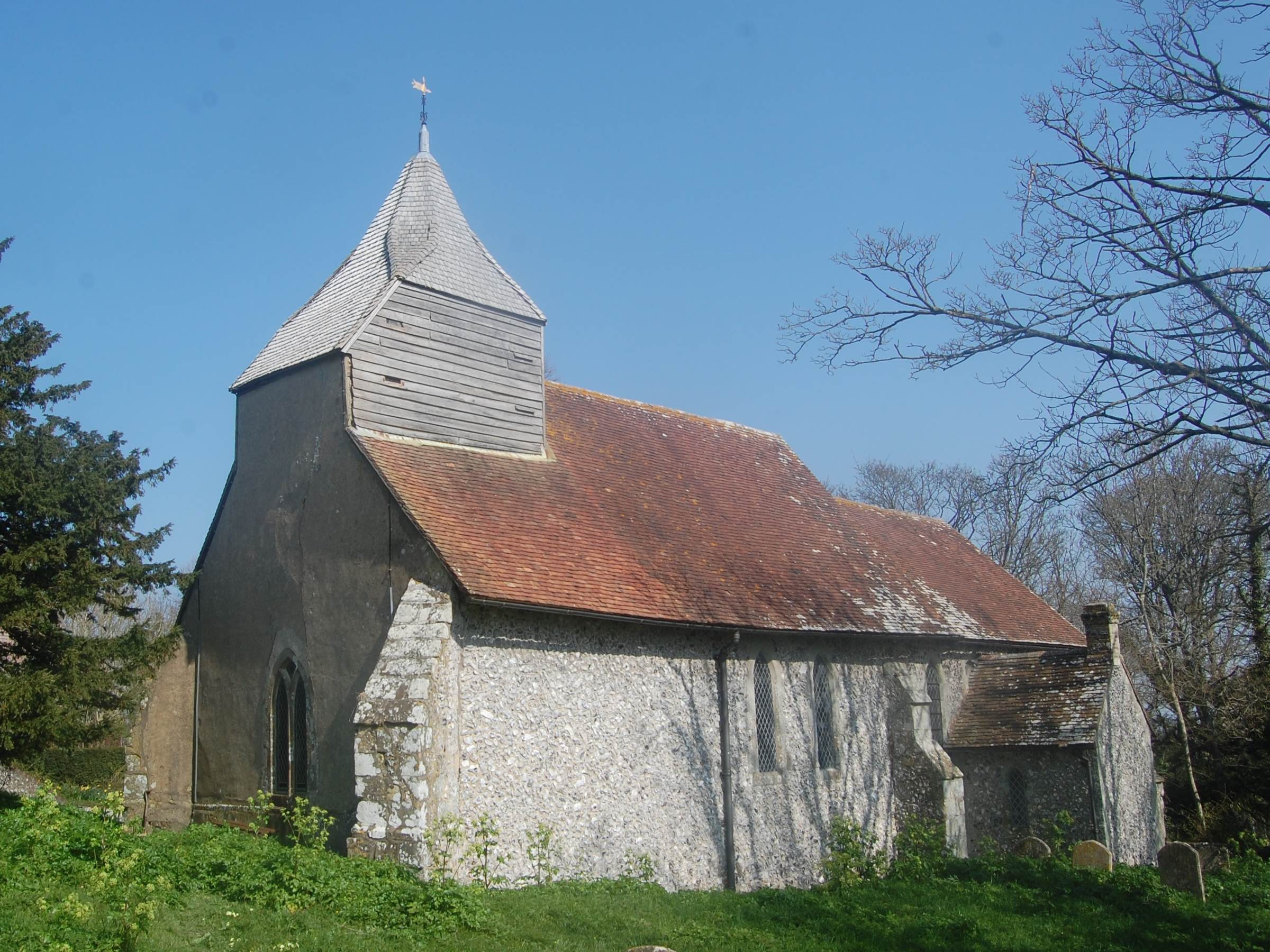
- The church in 2022
- St. Peter's Church
- Location: Folkington, East Sussex
- Country: England
- Denomination: Church of England

History
- Status: Active
- Founded: c. 13th century

Listed Building – Grade I
- Official name: The Parish Church of Saint Peter
- Designated: 30 August 1966
- Reference no.: 1193438

The Church of St. Peter ad Vincula is a parish church in Folkington, East Sussex dating from the 13th century. It is built of flint and rubble, a Grade I listed building and an active parish church.

== History ==
The origin of the church is rooted in 13th century. The interior contains some 18th century funerary monuments, which Pevsner considers as "very grand" for their modest setting and a set of panelled box pews and pulpit. The church was lightly restored in 1870. The organ dates from 1917 and was a gift of Mary Earle Gwynne of Folkington, in memory of the men of the village who died in World War I. It remains as an active parish church.

The graveyard contains the grave of the cookery writer Elizabeth David, marked by a slate headstone carved in 1992 by the local stonemason Geoffrey Aldred.

Just inside the door, on the left-hand side wall is a small stone relief sculpture commissioned by the family of Ronald Stacy Marks, by John Skelton (sculptor).

== Architecture and description ==
The church is constructed of flint and rubble. The bell turret is weatherboarded with a "shingled spirelet". The building is listed Grade I.
