= Hammerwood =

Hamlet in East Sussex, England

Coordinates: 51.134°N 0.054°E

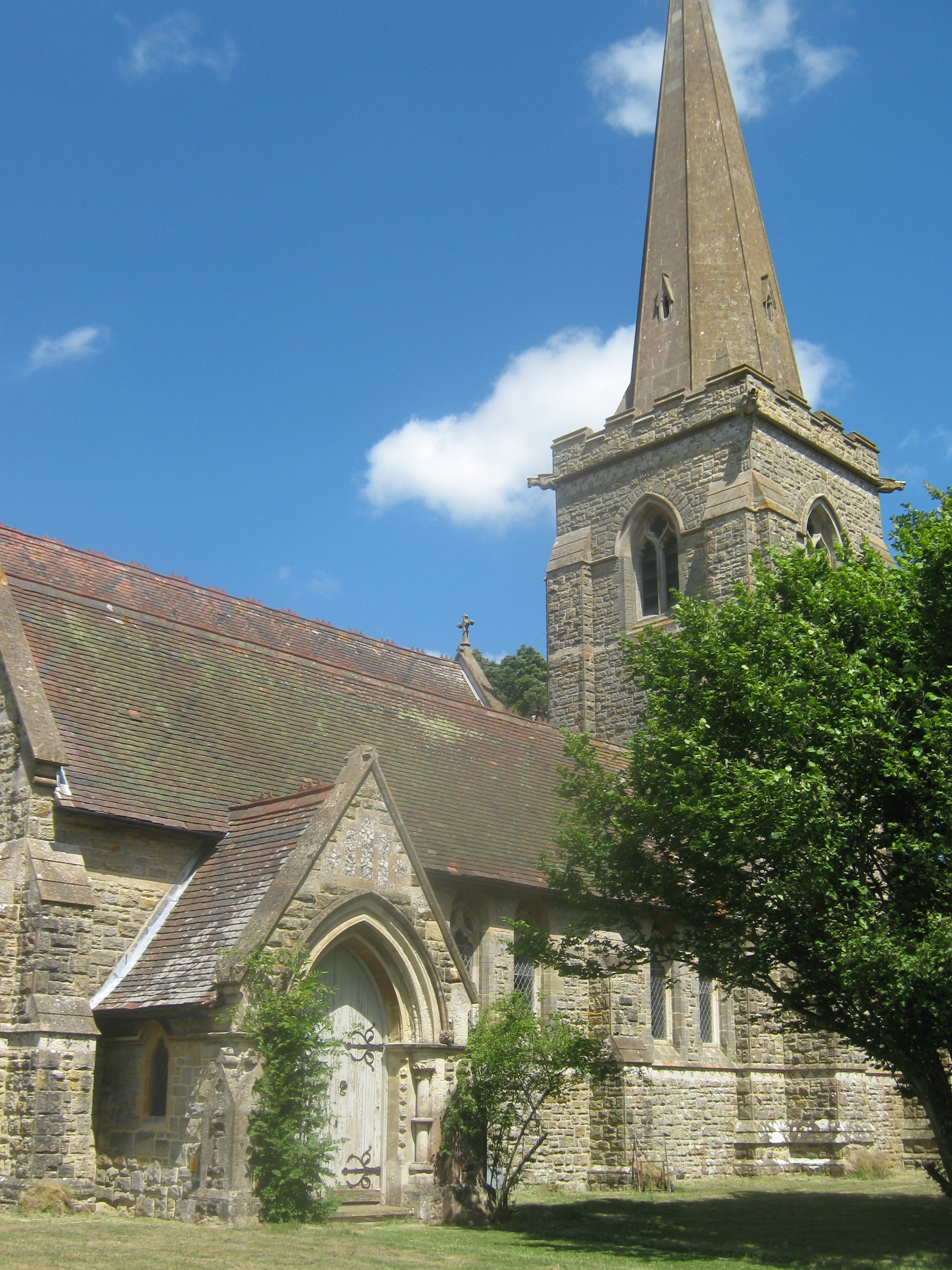
- St Stephen's Church, Hammerwood

- Location within East Sussex
- OS grid reference: TQ438391
  - London: 28 miles (45 km) NNW
- Civil parish: Forest Row
- District: Wealden
- Shire county: East Sussex
- Region: South East
- Country: England
- Sovereign state: United Kingdom
- Post town: East Grinstead
- Postcode district: RH19
- Dialling code: 01342
- Police: Sussex
- Fire: East Sussex
- Ambulance: South East Coast
- UK Parliament: Sussex Weald

Hammerwood is a village in the civil parish of Forest Row in East Sussex, England. Its nearest town is East Grinstead, 3.5 miles (5.6 km) west of the village. The village is in the High Weald, near the borders of East Sussex, West Sussex, Kent and Surrey.

== History ==
=== Early history ===
The village's name comes from its connections to the Wealden iron industry, and a reference to the hammer used in the furnace of the iron forge. A Romano-British iron bloomery, now a scheduled monument, was located near the ponds to the south-east of where the modern village is located, and a blast furnace existed on another site nearby from at least the 1500s. Areas of nearby woodland are similarly named, including Hammer Wood, Cansiron Wood and Cinder Wood. The settlement was, for several centuries, the central part of an estate known as the Bower, and is believed to have comprised part of a medieval deer park.

=== Development ===
In 1792, a site to the south-east of the nucleus of the current settlement was selected by architect Benjamin Henry Latrobe and his commissioner, John Sperling, as the location on which they would build Hammerwood Park, a country house which was one of the first examples of Greek Revival architecture in Great Britain.

Many of the buildings which form part of Hammerwood today were constructed in the 19th century as tied cottages to support the Hammerwood estate, which at that time comprised 2,510-acre (1,020 ha).

Oswald Augustus Smith, who owned the estate from 1864 until his death in 1902, was responsible for much of the village as it now exists. He provided in 1864 for a Hammerwood Cricket Club; in 1873 for a village school for 100 children; in 1875 for the Vicarage, and in 1878 for St Stephen's Church; as well as for a number of other buildings in Holtye and East Grinstead. On 9 July 1880, an ecclesiastical parish of Hammerwood was duly formed from portions of those of East Grinstead and Hartfield. The population of Hammerwood reached a peak of 438 in 1891.

==== Church ====
Church of St Stephen
- Denomination: Church of England

History
- Status: Redundant church
- Founder: Oswald Augustus Smith (1826–1902)
- Dedication: St Stephen
- Consecrated: 11 November 1880

Architecture
- Heritage designation: Grade II*
- Designated: 31 December 1982 1028406
- Architect: E.P. Loftus Brock
- Style: Gothic Revival, Decorated Gothic
- Groundbreaking: 1878
- Completed: 1880
- Construction cost: £7,431 (equivalent to £772,890 in 2025)
- Closed: 20 March 2016

The church was designed by E. P. Loftus Brock (1833–1895) in the 14th century Decorated Gothic style. It was built between 1878 and 1880, from rock-faced local sandstone and features a three-and-a-half-bay nave, a south aisle, a two-bay chancel, a north-east vestry, and a fortified south-east tower. The exterior masonry incorporates complex decorative details, including horizontal stone courses, flint-filled sawtooth sill bands, and stone chequerwork on the west elevation, while the roofs are clad in red and black tiles arranged in diaper patterns. The tower is finished with battlements, gargoyles, and an octagonal stone spire with lucarnes.

Internally, the nave features an open-timbered roof and arcades supported by stone columns with foliate capitals, transitioning to a polygonal, panelled timber roof over the chancel. The church retains a comprehensive scheme of original Victorian fixtures, most notably a uniform series of stained glass windows executed by Clayton and Bell, and an octagonal carved stone font, an octagonal pulpit and cast-iron gasoliers. Notable 20th century additions to the interior include a 1920s ironwork lectern and a 1943 memorial monument by the sculptor Eric Kennington. It contains a two manual pipe organ, built by the firm of T. C. Lewis.

St Stephen's held its last service on 20 March 2016 (Palm Sunday), and the parish, which encompassed the villages of Hammerwood and Holtye, was dissolved on 1 November 2016. That part of the former parish in Hammerwood were transferred to the parish of Forest Row and Ashurst Wood, whilst parts of the parish in Holtye were transferred to the parish of Hartfield.

In November 2016, the Secretary of State for Culture, Media and Sport decided to upgrade the listing for St Stephen's Church to grade II* due to its architectural merit, preservation and connection to the historic estate. Additionally, the 1879 decorated gothic lych gate and church walls were newly listed at grade II.

=== 20th century ===
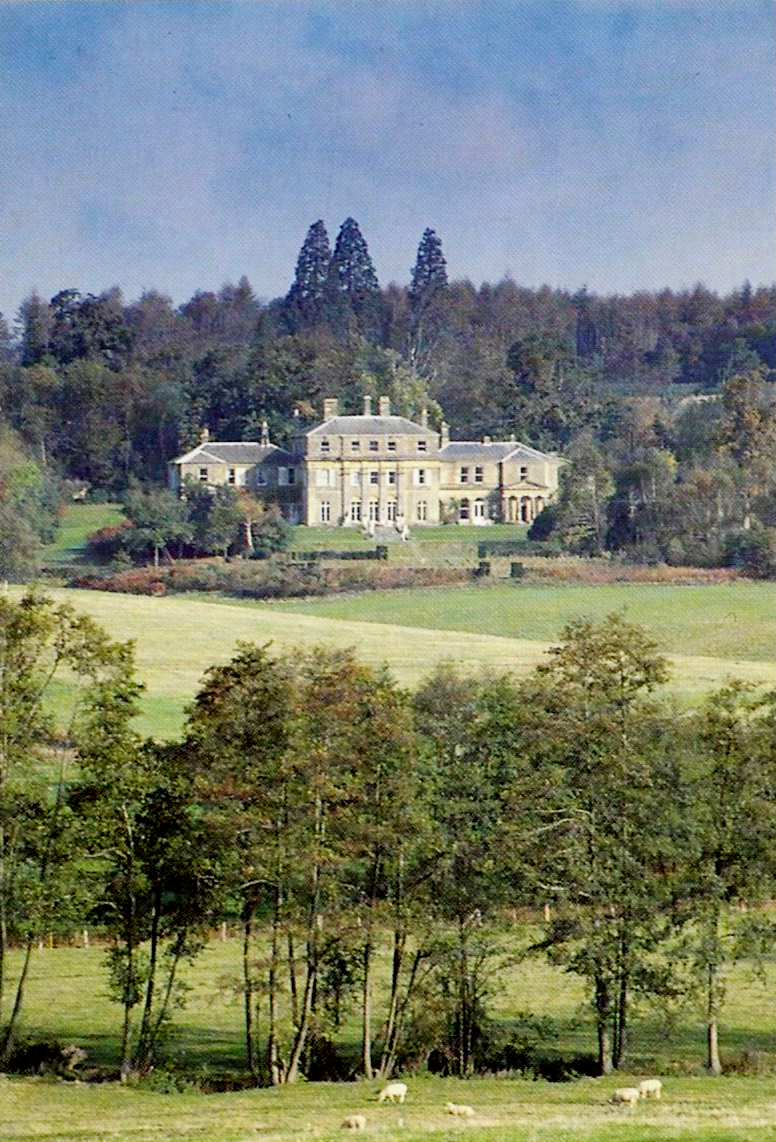
Hammerwood Park

The Hammerwood estate entered a period of decline after the First World War, and much of the village was sold off. In 1930, the owner of Hammerwood Park at that time, Lt. Col. Stephen Hungerford Pollen CMG (1868–1935), provided for a Hammerwood and Holtye Village Hall, next to the Vicarage. There was also a Hammerwood and Holtye Women's Institute, and a Hammerwood and Holtye Men's Club.

During the Second World War, on 2 March 1944 a Heinkel He 177 of the Luftwaffe's Kampfgeschwader 100 on a bombing mission to London was shot down over Hammerwood by a Mosquito Mk XIII of No. 151 Squadron RAF at 3:15 am. Six were on board the German aircraft; four survived, and wreckage was scattered widely in nearby woodland. Hammerwood Park was requisitioned for use by the armed forces during that war, becoming home to 200 soldiers (including the cricketer Denis Compton, and a contingent from the Canadian Army).

From November 1943, No. 660 Squadron RAF operated from an unpaved airstrip (RAF Hammerwood) to the east of the village, from which the SOE flew Westland Lysanders for a time. Flying ceased by July 1944.

On 29 August 1944, a V-1 flying bomb which had been shot down by an aircraft came down in the village. After the war, Hammerwood Park was divided into flats and the remnants of the estate were purchased by Led Zeppelin. It subsequently became derelict, before being purchased by the current owner in 1982. A programme of rolling restoration continues.

The Hammerwood County Primary School closed in 1959, and the ecclesiastical parish of Hammerwood was united with that of St Mary Magdalene, Cowden in June 1977.

== Geography ==
The village now sits in the High Weald National Landscape, and development is limited. The structure of the settlement, set along a lane from the A264 road, has remained unchanged for more than a century. There is a Scout campsite at Hammerwood owned and operated by the Lewisham North District Scouts.

== Landmarks ==
Hammerwood Park has been open to the public since 1983; tours take place at least twice weekly in summer, and musical events are held regularly.

For a settlement of its size, Hammerwood has an unusual number of buildings of historic and architectural interest. Hammerwood Park is listed at grade I, and its parkland at grade II. The Bower House, a 15th-century timber-framed farmhouse, is listed at grade II*; Monday Cottage and No 3 Bower Cottages, built by Richard Norman Shaw, at grade II; the Old School House, Brooklands, and Great Cansiron Farm at grade II. St Stephen's Church is listed at grade II*, and its 1879 decorated gothic lych gate and church walls are listed at grade II.

== Transport ==
Much of the settlement is set along a lane running south from the A264, which links the hamlet to East Grinstead, Tunbridge Wells and beyond. London Gatwick Airport is 12 miles (19 km) from the village, whilst Redhill Aerodrome and Biggin Hill Airport are both within half an hour's drive. The nearest railway stations are Cowden (2.8 miles (4.5 km)) on the London Bridge to Uckfield route, and Dormans (2.9 miles (4.7 km)) on the London Victoria to East Grinstead route and on the Thameslink route.

There is no bus service. Metrobus's 291 service stops hourly adjacent to the War Memorial in Ashurst Wood (approximately an hour's walk south from Hammerwood) with services to Crawley, East Grinstead, Tunbridge Wells and surrounding villages. Its 270 service connects Ashurst Wood to Haywards Heath and Brighton, and its 500 service connects Ashurst Wood to Gatwick Airport and Eastbourne.
