= Wootton Manor =

Country house in East Sussex, England

Coordinates: 50.825°N 0.221°E

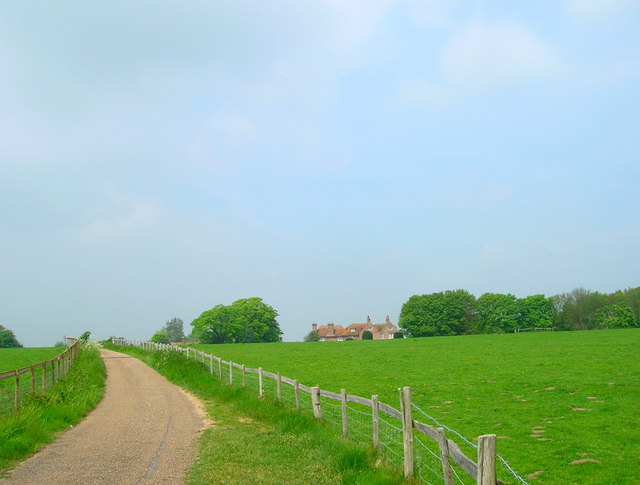
Approaching Wootton Manor

Wootton Manor is a country house in Folkington, East Sussex. Originally a mediaeval manor house, from which parts of the chapel survive, it was rebuilt in the mid-17th century in a rather old-fashioned Jacobean style. Rupert Gwynne and his wife settled in the house after their marriage in 1905, and later commissioned the Arts and Crafts architect Detmar Blow to restore and extend the house, which he did in four directions, and add outbuildings, as well as working in the gardens. The cookery writer Elizabeth David, and her three sisters, grew up in this house.

The central building has been listed as Grade II* by English Heritage.

== Sources ==
- Cooper, Artemis (1999). Writing at the Kitchen Table. London: Michael Joseph. ISBN 0-7181-4224-1.
- Historic England. "Wootton Manor (1001693)". National Heritage List for England.
- Historic England. "Central building of Wooton Manor (1043258)". National Heritage List for England.
