= Nutley, East Sussex =

Village in East Sussex, England

Coordinates: 51.03238°N 0.05511°E

Nutley
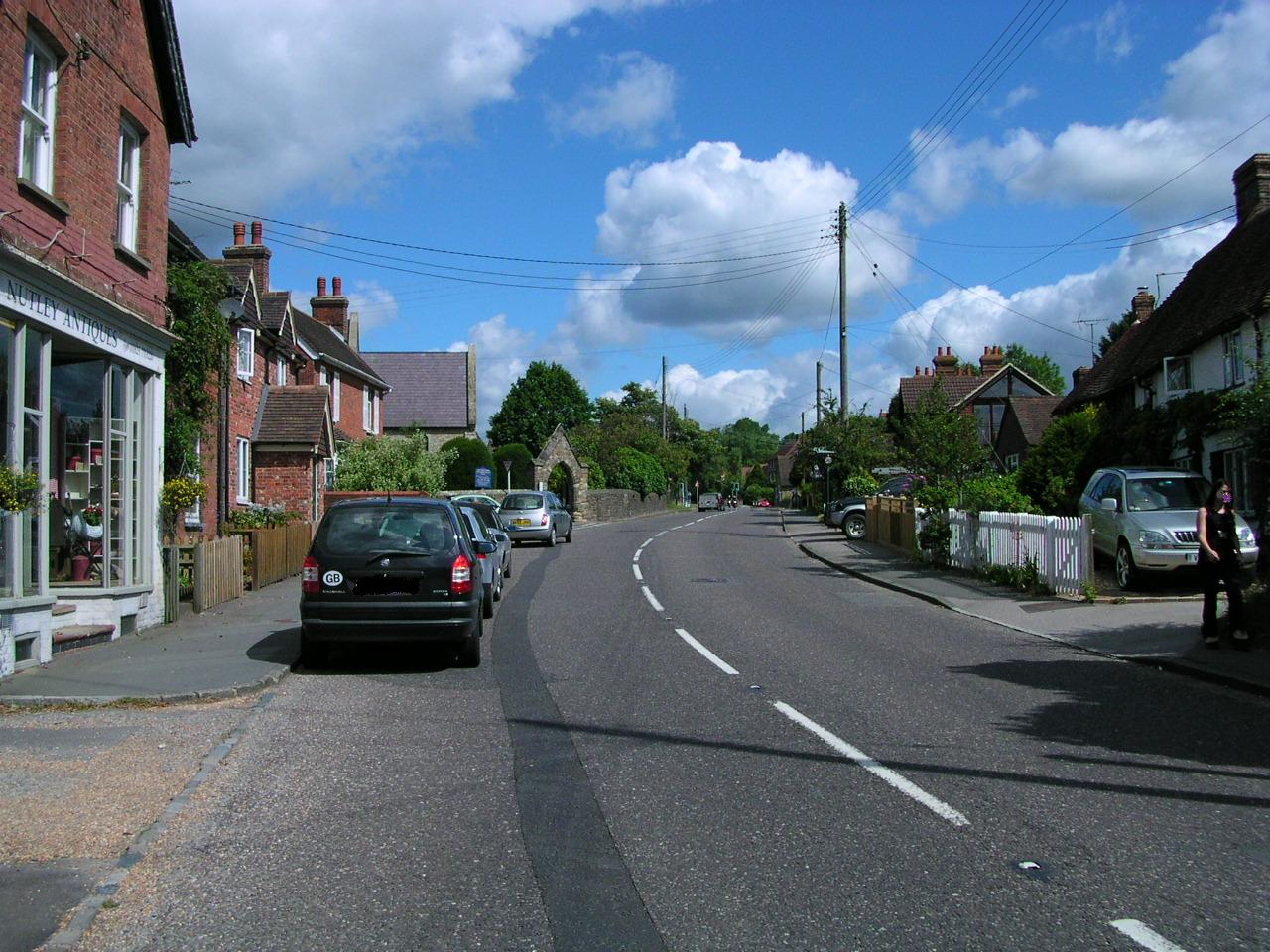
- Nutley village

- Location within East Sussex
- OS grid reference: TQ442279
  - London: 33 miles (53 km) NNW
- Civil parish: Maresfield
- District: Wealden
- Shire county: East Sussex
- Region: South East
- Country: England
- Sovereign state: United Kingdom
- Post town: UCKFIELD
- Postcode district: TN22
- Dialling code: 01825
- Police: Sussex
- Fire: East Sussex
- Ambulance: South East Coast
- UK Parliament: Wealden

Nutley is a village in the Wealden District of East Sussex, England. It lies about 5 mi (8.0 km) north-west of Uckfield, the main road being the A22. Nutley, Fairwarp and Maresfield together form the Maresfield civil parish.

The village is on the southern edge of Ashdown Forest which was a deer hunting reserve from the time of King Edward II.

== History ==
The Romans operated nearby in Duddleswell and Maresfield, working the iron ore to be found in the local Weald Clay using bloomeries. Roman coins and waste from furnaces has been found at these locations. When the Romans left Britain in the 5th century AD Saxon settlers lived on the site of Nutley. "Hnut's leagh" means "Hnut's Clearing", and is the most likely origin of the village's modern-day name.

Following the Norman Invasion of 1066, Nutley became part of the Rape of Pevensey. In 1176 a chapel was built by Richer de Aquila L'Aigle. It was thought to have been built in an area known as Chapelwood, along the Chelwood Gate road, just outside Nutley to the north west. 60 acres (24 ha) of land near Wych Cross on Ashdown Forest was granted to the chapel. It was attached to the church at Maresfield. The chapel went out of use after the English Reformation.

A field survey by Nutley Historical Society found no evidence of the chapel in that area but John Kelton's 1747 map of Ashdown Forest shows the ruins of the chapel located south of Nutley Inn on the east side of the main road. Hearsay evidence of a local historian suggested 'odd stones' were found during the building of Nutley Hall which stands roughly where Kelton's map sites the ruins of the chapel.

In 1372 Edward III gave the Chapel of Notlye (as it was called at the time) along with almost 1,400 acres (5.7 km^{2}) of land to his son, John of Gaunt. They were both frequent visitors to Ashdown Forest (then known as Lancaster Great Park; it would keep that name for the next three centuries) because of the hunting.

Contraband goods, shipped across the English Channel, were smuggled along the packhorse track from Duddleswell to Nutley. In 1721 Gabriel Tomkins, the leader of the Mayfield Gang, was captured and arrested in Nutley having been chased from Burwash. Tomkins was sentenced to seven years transportation, but gained his freedom by giving valuable information to the authorities. He went on to have a mixed career as both smuggler and customs officer, being Custom House Officer at Dartford in Kent in 1735 and Bailiff to the Sheriff of Sussex, but was hanged in 1750 at Bedford for robbing the Chester stage coach.

Nutley Windmill, a rare example of an open trestle post mill, was moved to Nutley from Goudhurst, Kent around 1817, her timbers being older than this. Standing on the edge of the forest she was modernised in the 1880s and operated until 1908.

It was only in the mid-19th century that the village school and the church, dedicated to Saint James the Less, were built. The land upon which the school was built was donated by the Earl and Countess De La Warr. Both the school and church are still in use today.

Piped water was first introduced to the village in the early 20th century, but electricity and telephones did not arrive until the 1930s.

During the First World War and Second World War Canadian troops were stationed at Pippingford Park near Nutley. In the Second World War a Wellington bomber returning from a raid over Germany crashed nearby on Ashdown Forest – Airmans Grave and the crew were all killed. In 1944 a stick of bombs from a German plane fell in Nutley, resulting in minor damage. A Spitfire flown by a Polish pilot caught fire and crashed on Funnels Farm down Nether Lane, killing the pilot and a BF109e piloted by Hans Bertram crashed in Nettlefold Field, killing him.

Twenty locals died in combat during the First World War. To commemorate their sacrifice, in 1921 wealthy local businessman Albert Turner donated a large brick granary and oasthouse for conversion into a village hall and war memorial, situated across the road from Whitewood's store and Post Office. Eighteen others died in the Second World War, and a second memorial hall was built in the 1970s, replacing the original hall which was converted into a residence.

The new hall stands opposite the school, and encompasses the social club, set of meeting rooms, a hall with stage, caretakers residence and the Parish Council office. The land upon which this second memorial hall stands was donated by the Nettlefold family. Today it is managed by the Nutley War Memorial Charitable Incorporated Organisation

== Geography ==
Situated within the Ancient Pale of Ashdown Forest, Nutley is surrounded by idyllic countryside. Nutley lies on the A22 London to Eastbourne main road.

Nutley's terrain near the main road is relatively flat, however the further one drifts from the main road the more undulating the land becomes. Off the A22, there are numerous side-roads and country lanes, many of which hold tradition in the village.

== Population ==
According to the 2001 Census, 1,342 persons live in Nutley. Approximately 47% of the population are male and 53% are female. The population reside in 520 households, and more than a fifth of the population live alone, including pensioners. The population has increased by 5% since the 1991 census.

== Economy ==
Local businesses and amenities include a social club, school, tennis and squash club, antique shop, village pub, Italian and Indian/Thai restaurants; petrol station and shop, two care homes, two motor repair workshops, car showroom and other small enterprises and businesses.

== Notable residents ==
- Author Neil Gaiman lived in Nutley between 1987 and 1992, and his house there became the setting for his book Coraline.
- Author Barbara Willard lived in Nutley for 39 years and wrote extensively about the area in fiction and non fiction books.
- English character actor Campbell Singer lived locally.
- Richard Caldicot, English character actor lived locally and was an official at Nutley Cricket Club.
- Dorothea Brooking, English children's television producer and director, lived in Nutley.
- Kay Cavendish, English popular pianist and radio entertainer, lived in Nutley.
- Francis Champneys, obstetrician, lived in Nutley for 30 years and died there at his residence Littlemead in 1930.
- Herewald Davies, Archdeacon of Tobago, born in Nutley.

== Gallery ==
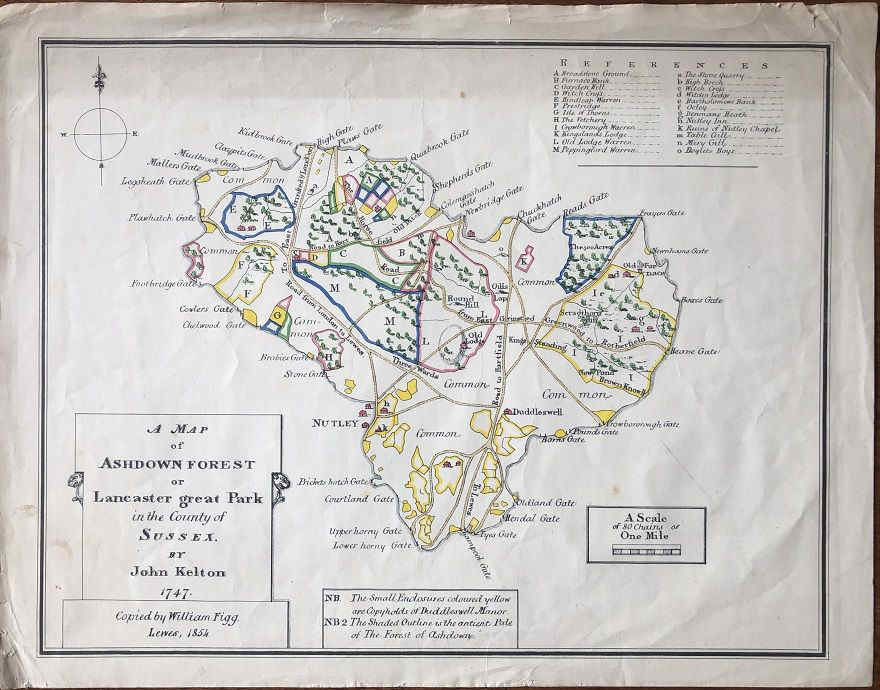
William Figg 1858 copy of Kelton 1747 map of Ashdown Forest

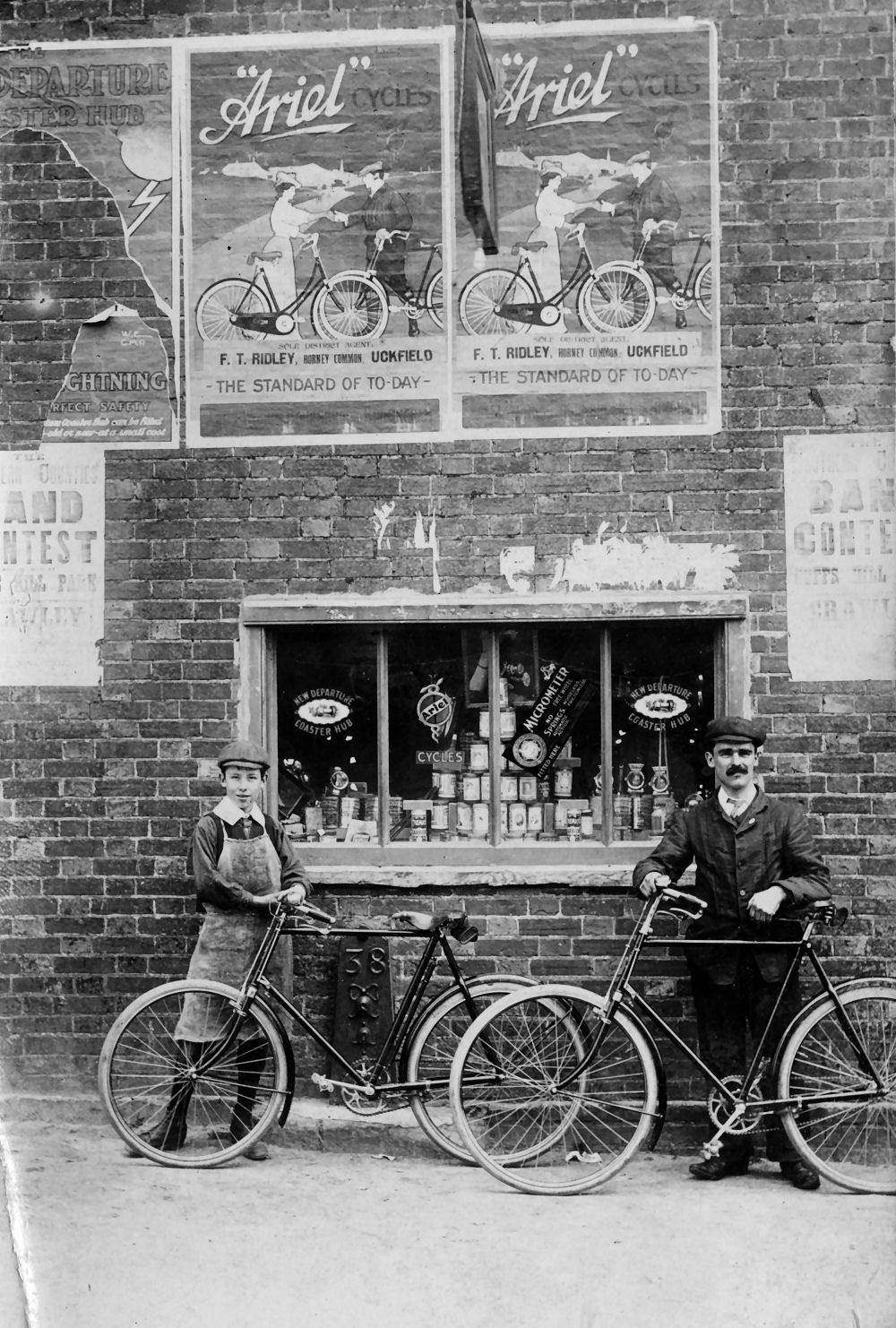
Bow Bells milepost at Nutley in 1906, 38 mile marker

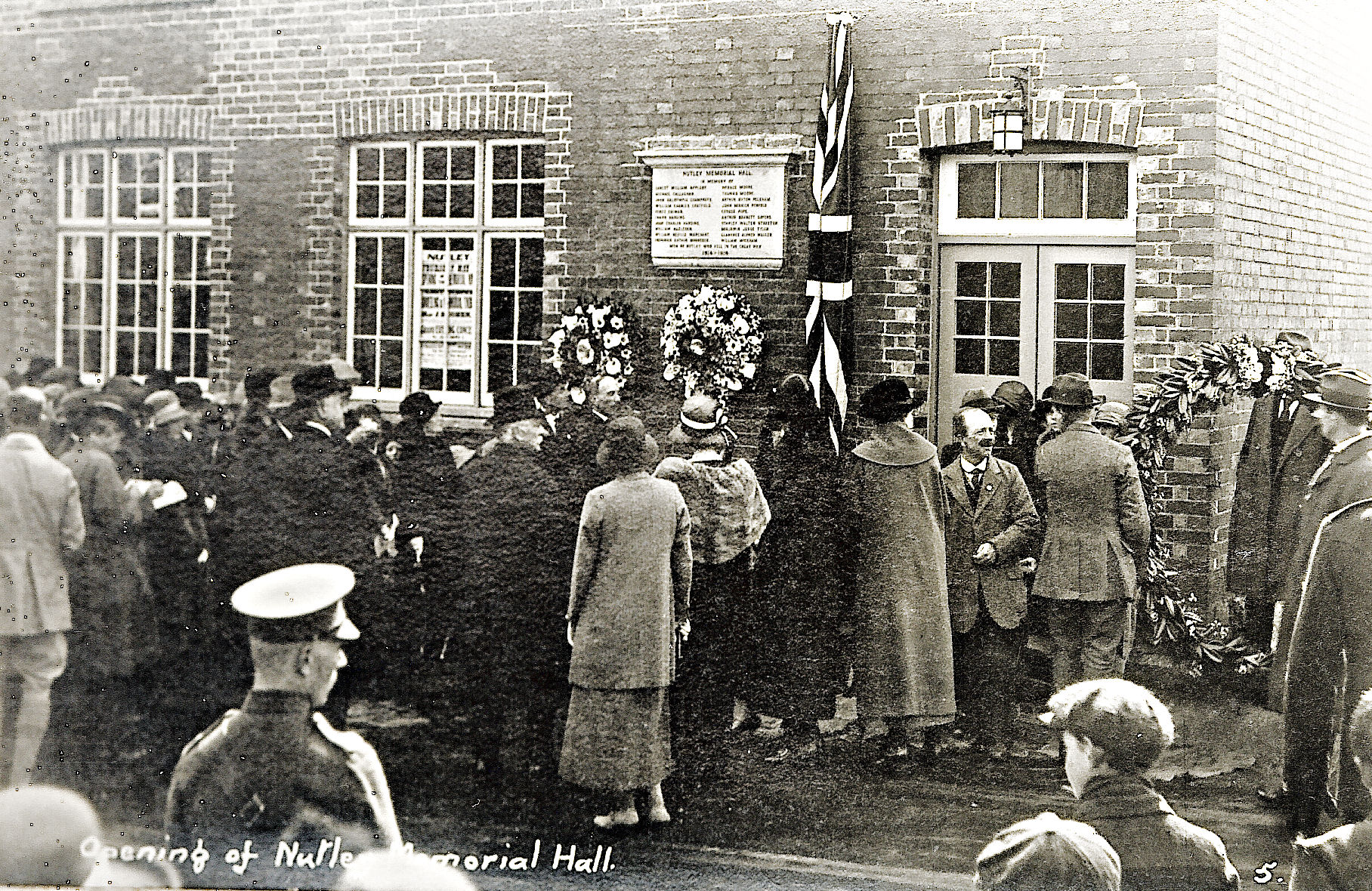
Opening of the original Nutley Memorial Hall in 1924

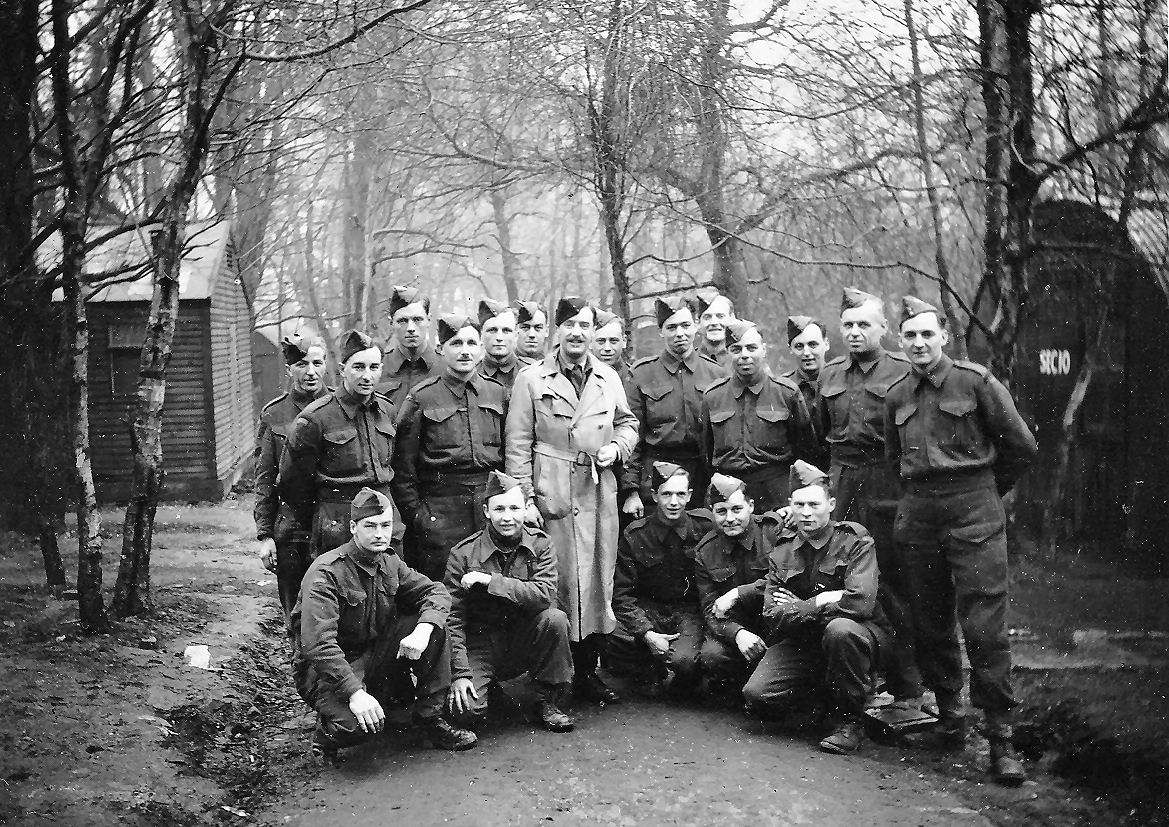
A group of Canadian soldiers stationed at Pippingford Park near Nutley in 1941

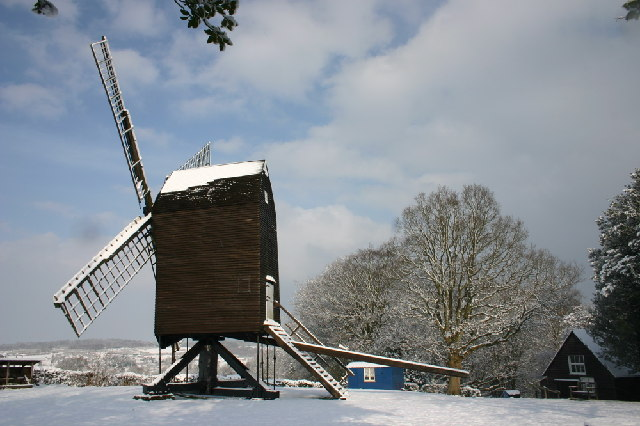
Nutley Windmill
