= Herewald Davies =

Herewald Ramsbotham Davies, OBE (1879-1957) was Archdeacon of Tobago from 1932 until 1946.

Davies was born in Nutley, East Sussex, educated at St Augustine's College, Canterbury and ordained in 1905. After curacies in Port of Spain and Scarborough, Tobago he was the incumbent at Caroni then Rural Dean of Tobago until his Archdeacon’s appointment.
