= Nutley Windmill =

Windmill in East Sussex, England

Nutley Mill
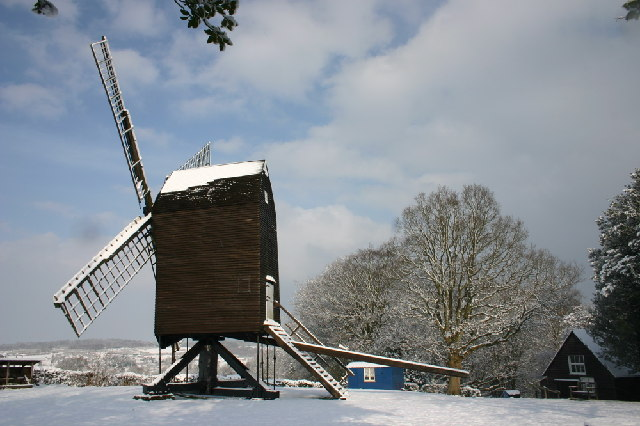
- The mill in 2005
- Interactive map of Nutley Mill

Origin
- Grid reference: TQ 451 291
- Coordinates: 51°02′35″N 0°04′05″E
- Operators: Uckfield and District Preservation Society
- Year built: Early nineteenth century

Information
- Purpose: Corn mill
- Type: Open Trestle post mill
- No. of sails: Four
- Type of sails: Two Common sails, two Spring sails
- Windshaft: Cast iron
- Winding: Tailpole
- No. of pairs of millstones: Two pairs, arranged Head and Tail

Nutley Windmill is a grade II* listed open trestle post mill at Nutley, East Sussex, England which has been restored to working order.

== History ==
Nutley Windmill is thought to have been moved from Kilndown, Goudhurst, Kent circa 1817. The first record of a windmill at Nutley is in 1840. A timber in the mill has been dated by dendrochronology to 1738–70, and the main post is even older, dating to 1533–70. In 1870, the mill was painted white and working on four common sails. The mill was modernised in the 1880s, with the original wooden windshaft being replaced by a cast-iron one, and spring sails replacing the commons. Larger millstones were added. The mill was tarred at about this point, as shown by a photo dated 1890. She worked by wind until 1908, although latterly in poor condition. In 1928, the owner of the mill, Lady Castle Stewart, had the mill shored up with brick piers and steel joists below the body. These allowed the mill to survive until she could be restored.

Restoration started in 1968, The mill turned by wind again in 1971, and ground grain again in 1972. In 1975, Nutley Windmill was given to the Uckfield and District Preservation Society by Lady Castle Stewart.

The Windmill is featured briefly in the 1976 concert film The Song Remains the Same, featuring the English rock band Led Zeppelin. It is the location for the night time fantasy scene starring Led Zeppelin's bass and keyboard player John Paul Jones. A stock broke in 1984, while filming was being done for the children's TV programme Chocky's Children for Thames Television. A new one was fitted a week later with aid from Thames. The mill was damaged in the Great Storm of 1987, with over £6,000 worth of damage incurred. New rear steps were fitted to the mill in 1994/5, the work funded by a grant from British Telecom. Repairs to the trestle and head wheel in 1998 allowed the head stones to be worked for the first time since the mill stopped work. New sails were fitted to the mill in 2008. Nutley Windmill featured on a postage stamp that was issued by the Royal Mail on 20 June 2017.

== Description ==
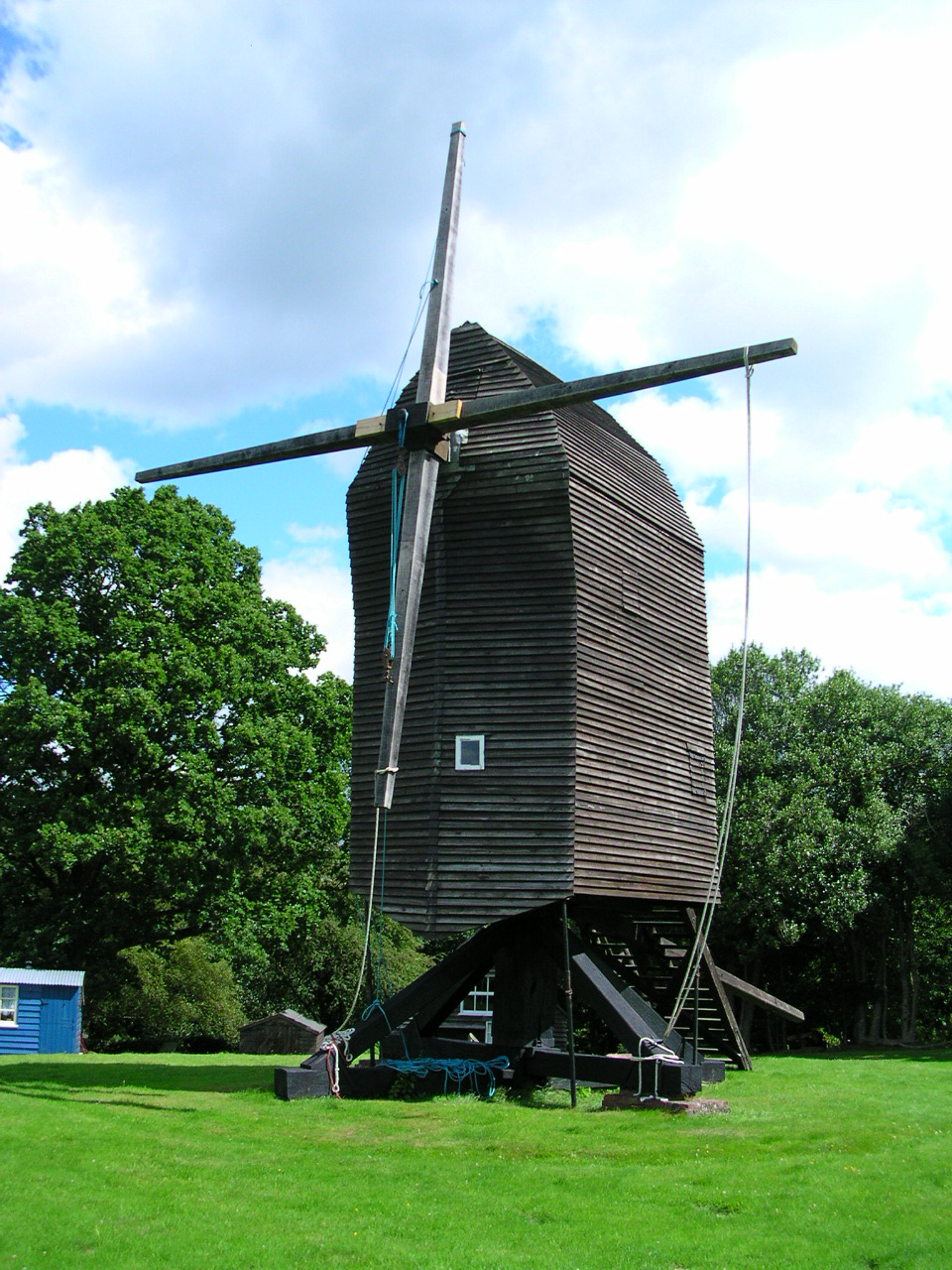
The windmill with sails closed

Nutley Windmill is an open trestle post mill. She has two common sails and two spring sails carried on a cast iron windshaft and is winded by a tailpole. The mill drives two pairs of millstones, arranged head and tail. The wooden head wheel and tail wheel are 7 feet (2.13 m) diameter each. Both have been converted from compass arm to clasp arm construction. The body of the mill is 15 feet (4.57 m) long and 10 feet (3.05 m) wide.

== Millers ==
The manorial records of Duddleswell show the land upon which the windmill sits was formed by a partition of a tenement in 1836 of 7 acres on the condition that no dwelling be erected.

Subsequent manorial and Census records give the names and occupations of the people living at the windmill, starting with Henry Sitford from 1836 until 1862 when he forfeited it on non-payment of the mortgage.

- 1836 – 1862 Henry Sitford (then forfeit on non-payment)
- 1862 – 1862 William Wells (sold to Robert Hollands)
- 1862 – 1867 Robert Hollands (mortgaged to William Wells then forfeit on non-payment))
- 1867 – 1874 William Wells (then sold to William Taylor)
- 1874 – 1906 William Taylor (then enfranchised)

Reference for the above content.
