= Michelham Priory =

Church and museum in East Sussex, England

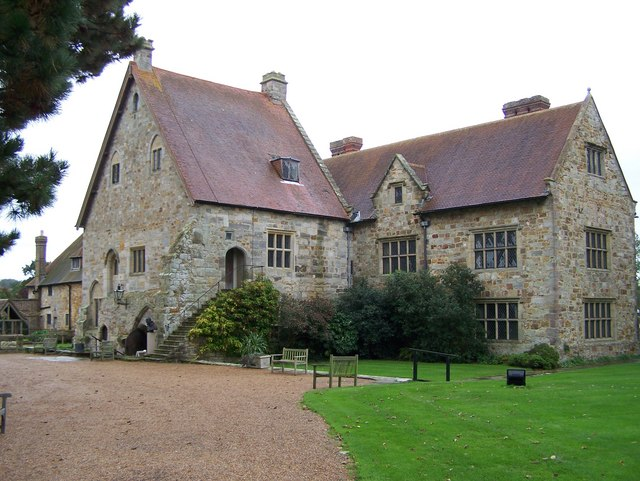
- Michelham Priory
- Interactive map of Michelham Priory

Monastery information
- Full name: Priory of the Holy Trinity
- Order: Augustine
- Established: 1229
- Disestablished: 1537
- Mother house: Hastings Priory
- Dedication: Holy Trinity

People
- Founder: Gilbert de Aquila

Site
- Location: Upper Dicker, East Sussex
- Coordinates: 50°51′45″N 0°12′50″E
- Grid reference: TQ 5587 0930
- Public access: Yes
- Website: Official website

Michelham Priory is the site of a former Augustinian Priory in Arlington, East Sussex, England, United Kingdom. The surviving buildings are owned and administered by the Sussex Archaeological Society and are Grade I and Grade II listed.

A T-shaped stone-built structure, the east and north wings date from the 13th century and the west wing from the 16th century. The north wing, originally the Priors Lodging, comprises three storeys with an attic and the other two wings two storeys. The roof is tiled. The whole is surrounded by a moat, enclosing an area of almost 8 acres (3.2 ha).

A watermill in the grounds of the priory has been restored to working order and is open to the public.

== History ==
=== The medieval priory ===
The Augustinian Priory of the Holy Trinity was founded at Michelham in 1229 by Gilbert de Aquila, whose father had been a benefactor of Bayham Abbey in Kent and also had connections to Otham Abbey in East Sussex. Michelham was a daughter house of Hastings Priory.

All Gilbert's lands and honours were forfeited in 1235 as punishment for his going to Normandy without licence from King Henry III.

In 1278 and again in 1287, the prior was fined for exercising illegal privileges. On 26 June 1283, John de Kyrkeby renounced his election as Bishop of Rochester at Michelham Priory before John Peckham, Archbishop of Canterbury.

King Edward I stayed overnight at the priory on 14 September 1302. In 1353, the prior was fined 40d because a bridge at Rickney was broken and blocking the river. By 1398, the priory was reported to be in a ruinous condition. Robert Reade, bishop of Chichester, granted the advowsons of Alfriston and Fletching to Michelham Priory in that year.

=== Dissolution and later use ===
The Priory was seized in 1537 under Henry VIII during the Dissolution of the monasteries. The priory and its possessions was then granted to Thomas Cromwell. Following Cromwell's execution in 1540, it was granted to Anne of Cleves. Part of it was leased to Thomas Culpeper, with the greater part of the site passing to William, Earl of Arundel. In 1544, Henry, Earl of Arundel exchanged Michelham Priory with Queen Mary for other property. In 1556, the priory was sold to John Foote and John Roberts for £1,249 16s 10d. Foote alienated the manor and hundred of Michelham Parkegate to Ambrose Smythe in 1574. In 1584, Smythe granted it to John Morely and Elizabeth, his wife. Morley granted the priory to Herbert Pelham in 1587.

The church and some of the buildings were demolished between 1599 and 1601. In the former year, the priory was made over in trust to Thomas Peirse, Thomas Pelham and James Thatcher to be sold to provide an annuity of £400 and pay off his debts. In 1601, the priory was sold to Thomas Sackville, 1st Earl of Dorset (Lord Buckhurst) for the sum of £4,700. On his death in 1608, the property passed to his son Robert Sackville, 2nd Earl of Dorset. In 1609, it passed to Richard Sackville, 3rd Earl of Dorset. On Richard's death in 1630, the priory passed to his wife, Lady Anne Clifford. On her death in 1675, the property remained in the Sackville family, passing down the Earls (later Dukes) of Dorset until the death of John Sackville, 3rd Duke of Dorset in 1799, then passing to his daughter Mary, Countess of Plymouth. She married William Amherst, 1st Earl Amherst in 1839.

It was sold to James Gwynne in 1896 and was where his children Rupert, Roland and Violet grew up. The property remained in private hands into the 20th century, when it was restored by the Sussex architect and antiquarian, Walter Godfrey. It was used as a base for Canadian troops during the winter of 1941-42 while they prepared for the Dieppe Raid. Later it was the East Sussex headquarters of the Auxiliary Territorial Service.

In 1958 Mrs R.H. Hotblack (Stella Hotblack) purchased the property with the aim of preserving it for posterity. With an endowment from Kenneth, Earl of Inchcape as a memorial to his friend John Fletcher Boughey who was killed during the Second World War, Hotblack gave the property in trust to the Sussex Archaeological Society on 1 November 1959.

=== Priors of Michelham ===
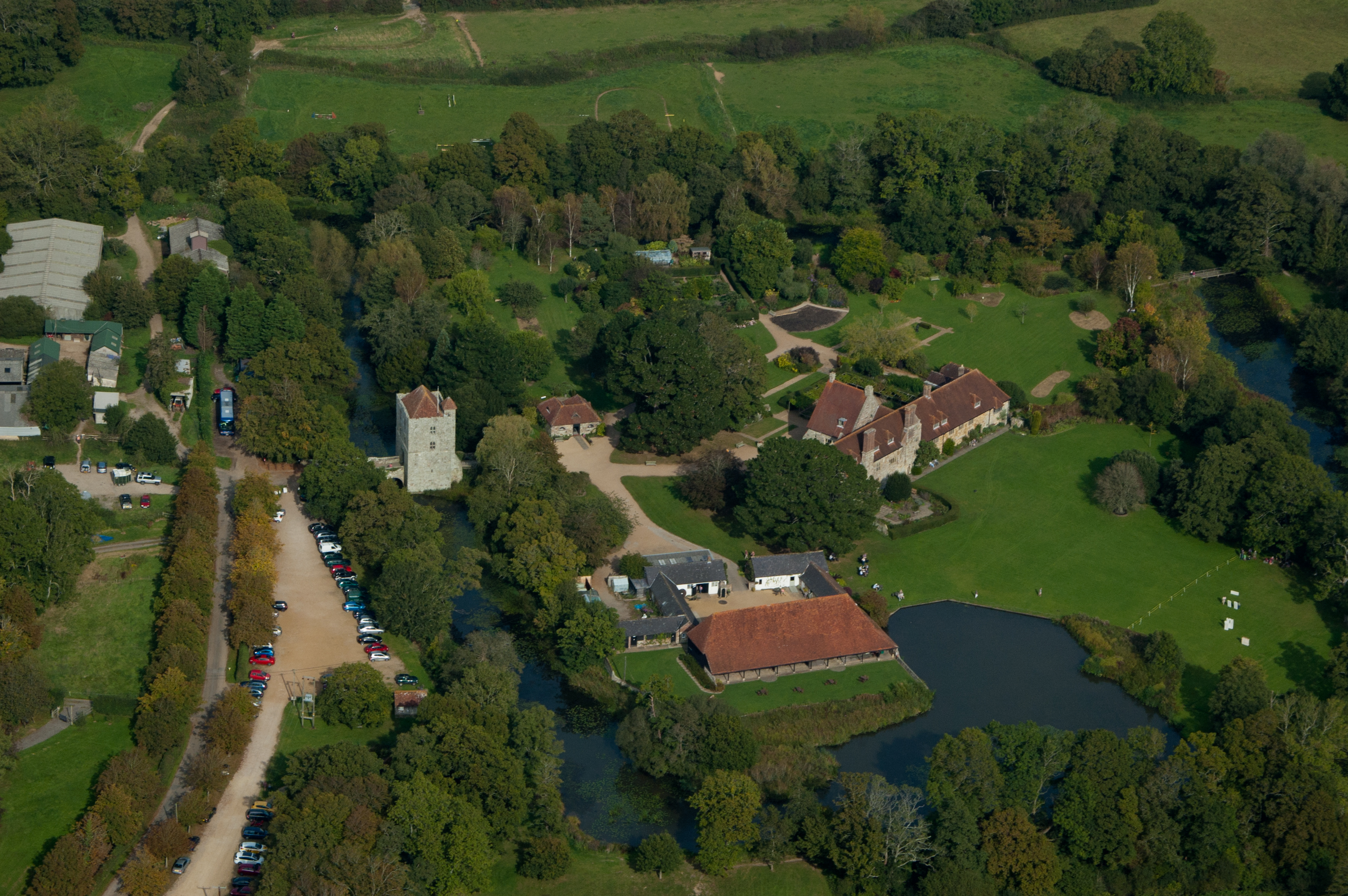
Aerial view of Michelham Priory. Barbican tower (centre left), dovecot (centre), refectory (centre right), watermill (bottom left) and barn (bottom centre)

The following priors are recorded at Michelham Priory

- 1229 Roger
- 1239–c.1260 Peter
- 1248–68 Roger (II)
- 1273 William
- 1278 Nicholas
- 1287 Roger (III)
- 1290 Luke de la Gare
- 1302 John de Echingham†
- c.1322–34 William de Shelvestrode
- c.1376–c.1415 John Leem
- c.1434–38 William London
- 1438–c.1447 Laurence Wynchelse
- c.1450–83 Edward Marley
- 1482–c.1509 John West
- c.1518–37 Thomas Holbeme
- 1533 John

† Italics denotes a possible prior.

== Buildings ==
=== Barn ===
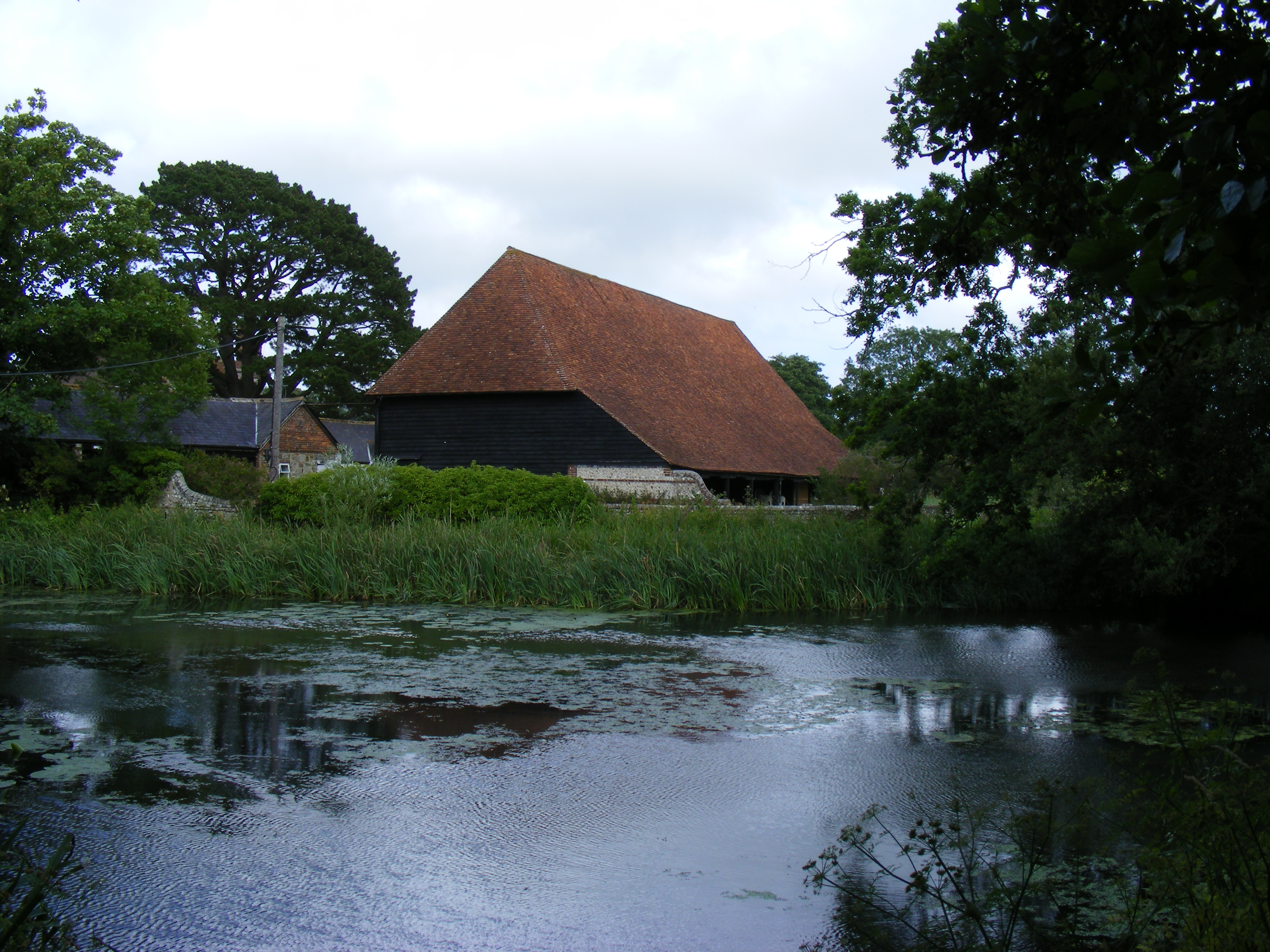

The barn was built between 1587 and 1610. It is on a timber frame clad with tarred weatherboards. The arched queen post roof is covered with pegtiles. The barn is Grade II listed, and currently serves as a function and meeting room.

=== Chapter house and dormitory ===
The chapter house and dormitory stood south of the church, on the east of the site.

=== Church ===
The church stood to the north of the surviving refectory. It possessed five bells. No trace of it remains today.
The five bells, cast by unknown founders, collectively weighed 40cwt (2030Kg) and were sold to John Ipingbury for £26 13s 4d at the dissolution of the monasteries.

=== Dovecot ===
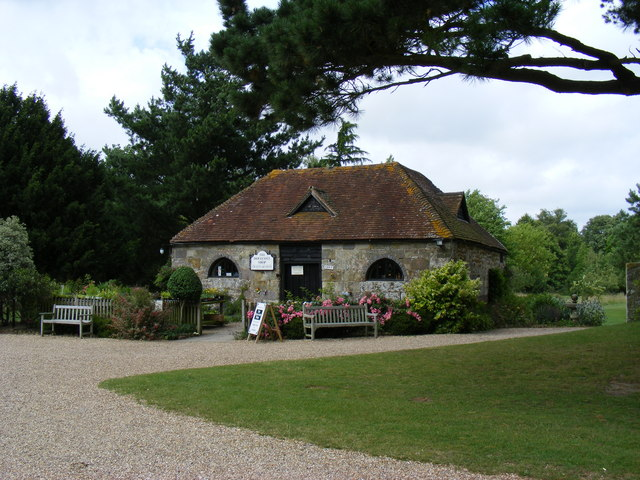

The dovecot, also described as a stables or pigeon house, is a single-storey building of sandstone, ashlar on the south facing aspect under a hipped pegtile roof. Built in the 18th century, it is a Grade II listed building. The building has been converted to form a shop and tearoom.

=== Gatehouse ===
Michelham Priory Gatehouse
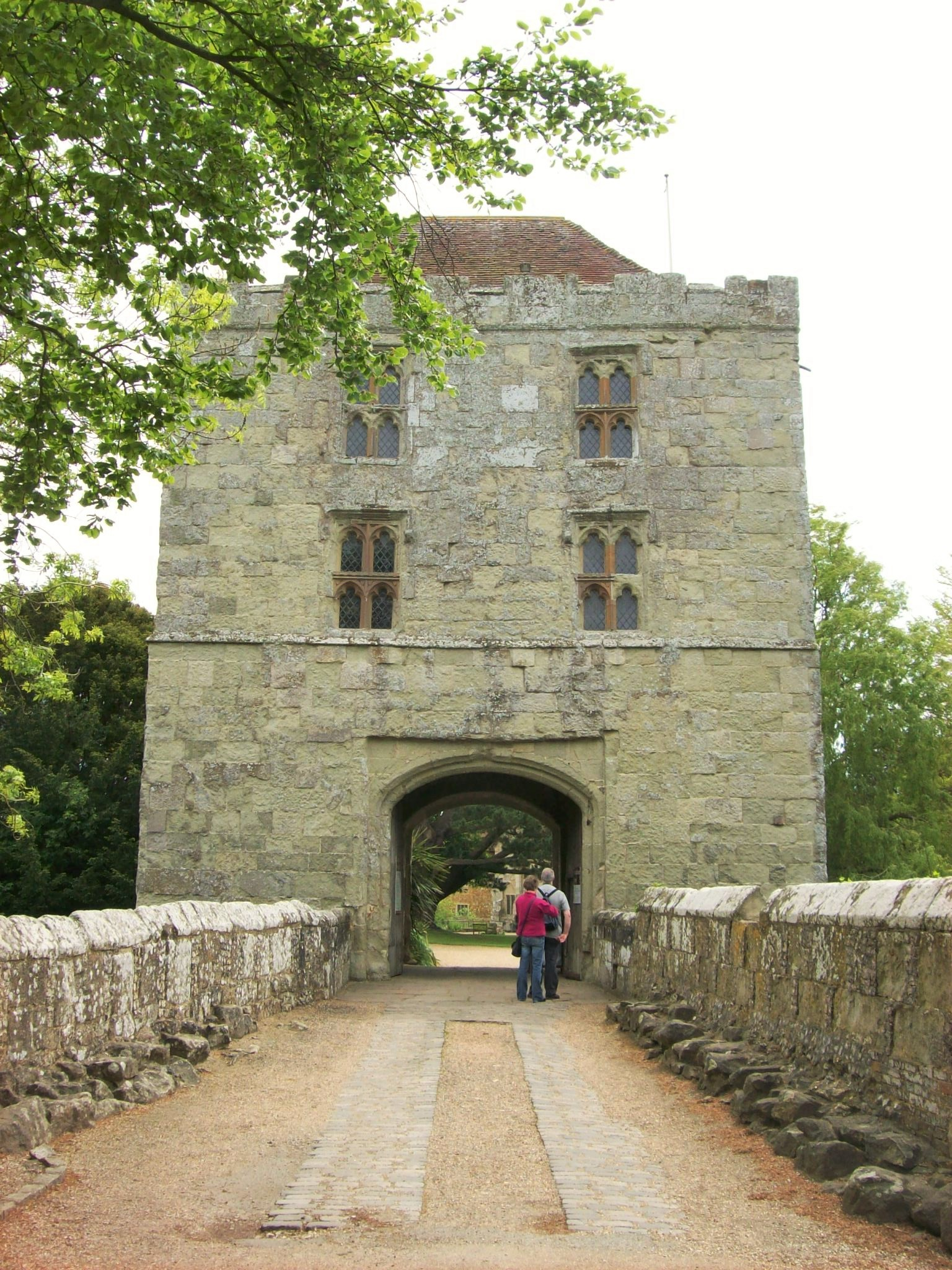
- The gatehouse

General information
- Coordinates: TQ 5581 0938
- Completed: Early C15th
- Owner: Sussex Archaeological Society

Height
- Height: c.50 feet (15 m)

Technical details
- Material: Stone; Peg tile roof
- Floor count: Four

The gatehouse was built in the early 15th century, during the time when John Leem was prior. A basement at moat level served either as a cellar or prison. The building is about 50 feet (15 m) high and contains four storeys, including the cellar.

In the 16th century, a stone bridge was built over the moat. The gatehouse and bridge are Grade I listed buildings.

=== Refectory ===
Refectory, Michelham Priory
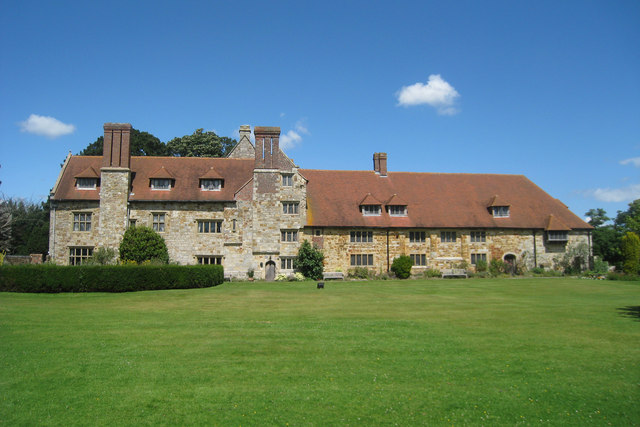
- The surviving refectory (right) with Prior's house (centre) and post-monastic additions (right)

General information
- Status: Museum
- Estimated completion: C13th (refectory & Prior's house); C16th (post-monastic addition)
- Owner: Sussex Archaeological Society

Technical details
- Material: Sandstone; Peg tile roof
- Floor count: One, later two (refectory); Three (post-monastic house)

The surviving refectory building originally contained a hall 40 feet (12 m) long. There was a window at the west end which was 13 feet 6 inches (4.11 m) wide, the outer frame of which survives today. This and the Prior's House are built of sandstone.

At the time of the Dissolution, the refectory was roofless. A second floor was added later and the building was divided into a number of rooms. Adjacent to the refectory is the Prior's House and crypt, which was above ground on account of the low-lying position of the priory and risk of flooding. There is a post-monastic extension on the west, built of stone. The whole is under a pegtile roof.

The refectory had been converted to use as a farmhouse by 1848. The crypt was divided into four rooms and used as a dairy by the 1850s. The whole is a Grade I listed building.

=== Watermill ===
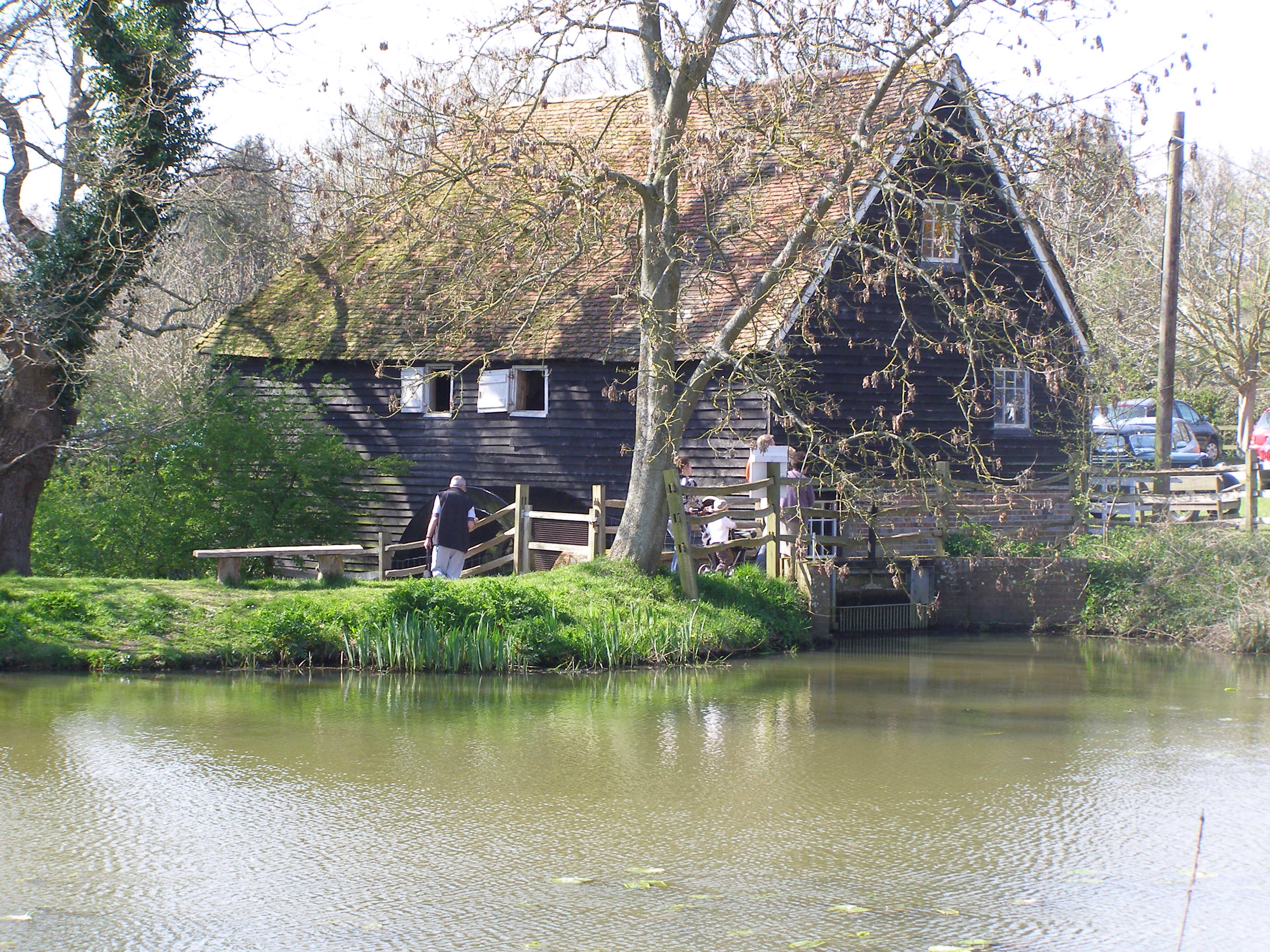

The moat round the priory was formed by damming the River Cuckmere and the watermill is fed by the moat. A watermill is mentioned at Michelham Priory as early as c.1260, In 1411 it was held by Robert de Blachington from William de Wrotham and his wife Joan de Kelle. In 1478, the priory owned two mills, which were both reported to be "in ruins". At the time the priory was dissolved, the mill produced an annual profit of 53s 3d.

The surviving building dates from the mid-C16th. Built on an oak frame, it is of three bays clad with weatherboards and under a pegtile roof. A porch bears the date 1714. The front of the mill was renewed c.1800. A cast iron waterwheel was fitted in 1896. It was removed in 1924–25, the mill having ceased commercial milling in 1924. As well as the waterwheel, the rest of the machinery was removed and the building served as a store. A turbine was installed in the mill race to generate electricity for the main house in the former refectory. It was still working in 1939.

The mill was restored to working order in 1972, new machinery and a new breastshot wooden waterwheel being fitted. The mill is a Grade II listed building. In 1996, the waterwheel was rebuilt and other machinery repaired or replaced as necessary. The work was partly funded by a £42,000 grant from the National Lottery.

== See also ==
- List of monastic houses in East Sussex
