= List of monastic houses in East Sussex =

The following is a list of the monastic houses in East Sussex, England.

Locations of monastic houses in East Sussex
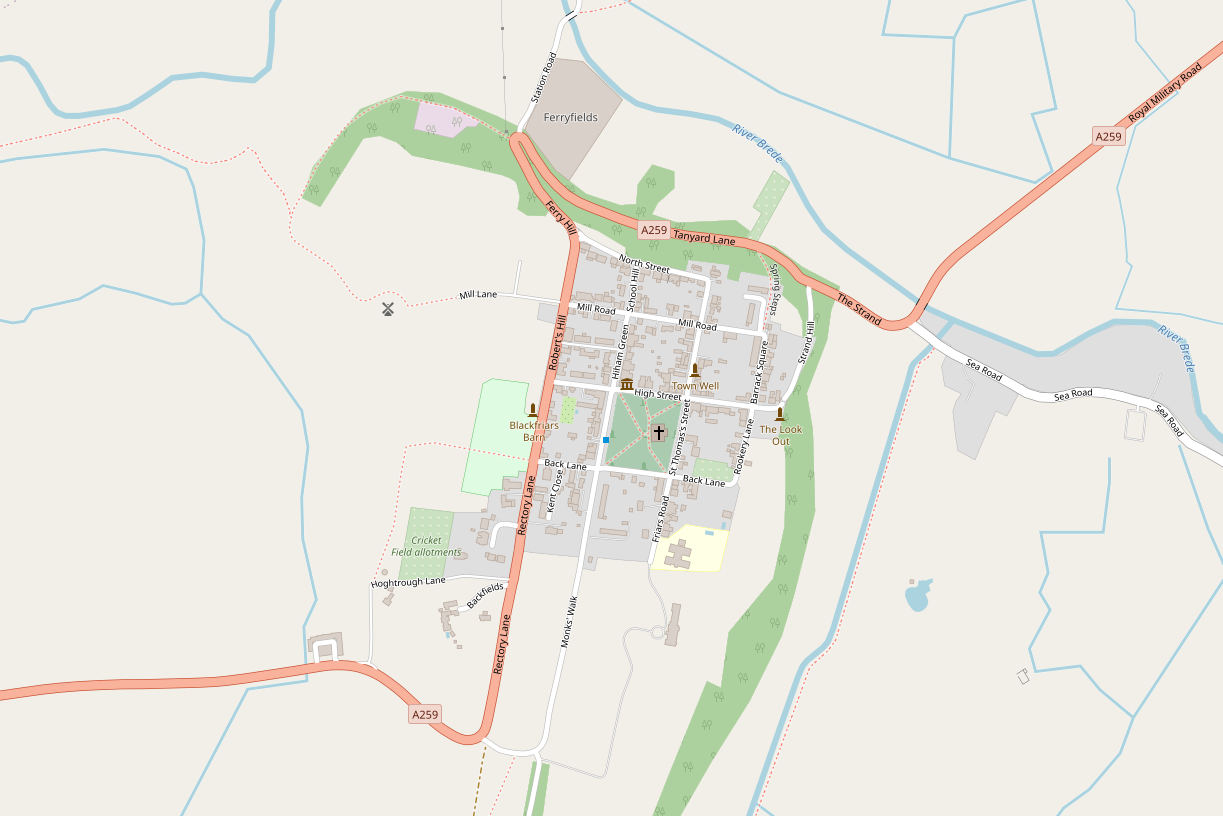
Locations of monastic houses in Winchelsea
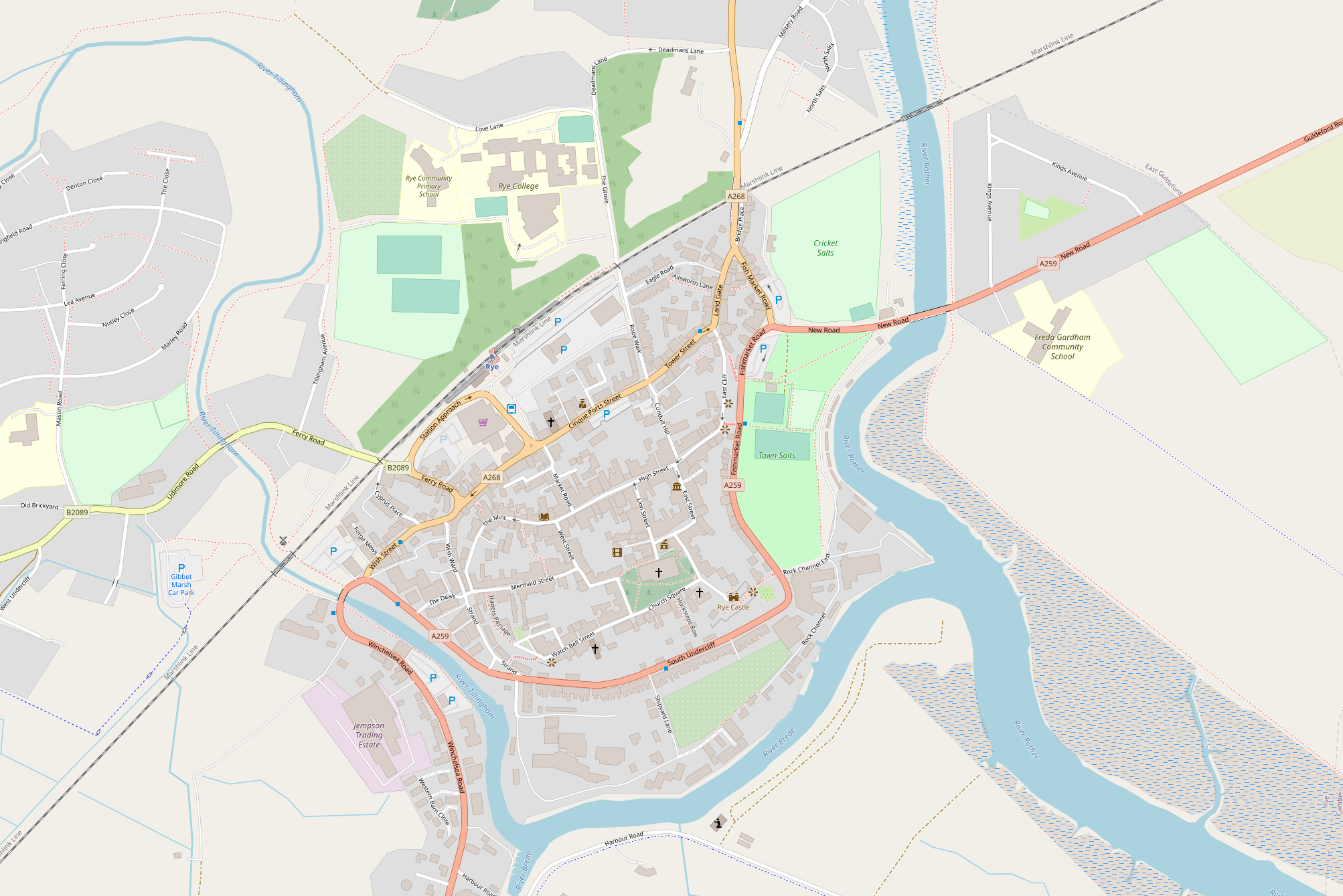
Locations of monastic houses in Rye

Alien houses are included, as are smaller establishments such as cells and notable monastic granges (particularly those with resident monks), and also camerae of the military orders of monks (Knights Templar and Knights Hospitaller). Monastic hospitals are included where they had the status or function of an abbey, priory, or preceptor/commandery.

Abbreviations and key

Status of remains
Symbol	Status
None	Ruins
*	Current monastic function
^{+}	Current non-monastic ecclesiastic function (including remains incorporated into later structure)
^	Current non-ecclesiastic function (including remains incorporated into later structure) or redundant intact structure
^{$}	Remains limited to earthworks etc.
^{#}	No identifiable trace of the monastic foundation remains
^{~}	Exact site of monastic foundation unknown
^{≈}	Identification ambiguous or confused

Locations with names in italics indicate possible duplication (misidentification with another location) or non-existent foundations (either erroneous reference or proposed foundation never implemented) or ecclesiastical establishments with a monastic name but lacking actual monastic connection.

Trusteeship
EH	English Heritage
LT	Landmark Trust
NT	National Trust

Foundation	Image	Communities & provenance	Formal name or dedication & alternative names	References & location
Battle Abbey		Benedictine monks founded 1067 by William the Conqueror; dissolved 27 May 1538; granted to Sir Antony Brown 1538/9; (EH)	The Abbey Church of the Holy Trinity, Saint Mary and Saint Martin ____________________; St Martin's Abbey; Battel Abbey	50°54′52″N 0°29′15″E
Bayham Abbey		Premonstratensian Canons — from Brockley, Kent (Greater London) between 1199 and 1208, and from Otham between 1208 and 1211 daughter house of Prémontré founded c.1207 (1200) by Robert of Thornham (Robert de Turreham); (established on the union of Otham and Brockley Abbeys) dissolved 1525; (EH)	the Blessed Virgin Mary ____________________; Bayham Old Abbey; Beigham Abbey	51°06′14″N 0°21′19″E
Beddingham Monastery		Saxon monastery in the reign of Offa (757–96); possibly destroyed in raids by the Danes 9th century		50°50′41″N 0°02′39″E
Hailsham Cell		Premonstratensian Canons cell, dependent on Bayham; founded after 1260; dissolved 1280–7 (canons expelled, restored and again expelled); restored 1296 in return for annual payment to Michelham		50°51′47″N 0°15′37″E
Hastings Priory		Augustinian Canons Regular — (?)Arroasian founded 1189–99 by Walter Bricet, or more probably by Walter de Scotney; structure physically moved inland to Warbleton due to encroachment of the sea; dissolved 1413; dissolved 1539; granted to John Baker 1537/8; masonry from the establishment was excavated during the construction of the Ritz Cinema; ESK Warehouse constructed on site	The Priory Church of the Holy Trinity, Hastings	50°51′22″N 0°34′37″E
Hooe Grange		Benedictine monks alien house: grange, dependent on Bec-Hellouin founded 1106; dissolved before 1230		
Langney Priory		Cluniac monks grange, dependent on Lewes founded before 1121; now a house	’'Langney Grange'’	50°47′47″N 0°18′55″E
Lewes Greyfriars		Franciscan Friars Minor, Conventual (under the Custody of London) founded before 1241; dissolved 1538		
Lewes Priory		Cluniac monks alien house: dependent on Cluny; founded 1077 (1078–81) by Earl William de Warenna (Warenne) and his wife Gundreda who granted the church of St Pancras; became denizen: independent from 1351; dissolved 16 November 1537; granted to Richard Baker and Richard Sackville 1559/60		50°52′05″N 0°00′31″E
Michelham Priory ^		Augustinian Canons Regular — (?)Arroasian founded 1229 by Gilbert de Aquila (L'Aigle); dissolved 1536; granted to William Earl of Arundel 1541/2; remains incorporated into a mansion; now in ownership of Sussex Archaeological Society	The Priory Church of the Holy Trinity, Michelham	50°51′46″N 0°12′51″E
Otham Abbey, Polegate		Premonstratensian Canons — from Durford(?), Sussex founded c.1180 (1175, 1180-3(?)), or between 1180 and c.1187 (probably before 1183 if colonized from Durford) by Ralph de Dene; united with Bayham 1208-11; transferred to Bayham and retained as grange and chapel from 1250; dissolved 1526; now Otteham Court and St Lawrence's Chapel	The Abbey Church of Saint Mary and Saint Laurence	50°49′47″N 0°15′07″E
Ramstede Priory		Benedictine nuns founded 1174–84 by Richard, Archbishop of Canterbury dissolved before 1204 by Hubert, Archbishop of Canterbury and nuns removed	St Mary Magdalene ____________________; Ramestede Priory	50°52′21″N 0°00′42″W
Robertsbridge Abbey		Cistercian monks daughter house of Boxley, Kent (community founded at Salehurst 29 March 1176); transferred here c.1250; dissolved 16 April 1538; granted to Sir William Sidney 1541/2; site now occupied by a private house without public access	Robert's Bridge Abbey; Pontrobert Abbey; Roberts-bridge Abbey	50°59′26″N 0°29′27″E
Rotherfield Priory (?)		doubtful establishment Benedictine monks founded 790(?); alien house: dependent on St-Denys; dubious charter evidencing grant by Bertoald, Duke of the South Saxons; dissolution unknown		51°02′22″N 0°12′34″E
Rye Austin Friars, earlier site		Augustinian Friars (under the Limit of Oxford) founded 1364; destroyed by French marauders 1377; transferred into Rye (see immediately below) 1378–9		50°56′48″N 0°44′47″E
Rye Austin Friars ^{+}		Augustinian Friars (under the Limit of Oxford) (community founded at earlier site (see immediately above) 1364); transferred 1378–9 following destruction of earlier foundation; dissolved 1538; the chapel extant, now called 'The Monastery'		50°57′06″N 0°44′04″E
Rye Friars of the Sack ^		Friars of the Sack founded c.1263; dissolved when order abolished before 1307; subsequently in secular use		50°56′58″N 0°44′01″E
Rye — Friary of St Anthony *		Conventual Franciscan Friars; St Walburga's Church opened 1900; parish in care of Franciscans 1910; St Anthony of Padua church opened 1930	The Friary Church of Saint Anthony of Padua	50°56′57″N 0°43′58″E
Salehurst Abbey		Cistercian monks — from Boxley, Kent (Greater London) daughter house of Boxley; founded 29 March 1176 by Alfred de St Martino; transferred to Robertsbridge c.1250	Robertsbridge Abbey (earlier site)	50°59′26″N 0°29′27″E
South Malling Monastery		Benedictine? monks founded before 686?; secular collegiate founded before c.770?; dissolved 1547		
Warbleton Priory ^		Augustinian Canons Regular — (?)Arroasian (community founded at Hastings 1189–99); refounded 1413 by Sir John Pelham: transferred from Hastings; dissolved 1536; remains incorporated into Priory Farm, in private ownership without public access	The Priory Church of the Holy Trinity, Hastings ____________________; Rushlake Priory; New Priory of Hastings	50°56′21″N 0°20′04″E
Wilmington Priory ^{+}		Benedictine monks alien house: dependent on Grestein; cell founded before 1086 by Robert, Earl of Morteton; priory founded before/c.1243 by Herluin; dissolved 1414; granted to Dean and Chapter of Chichester; granted to Sir Richard Sackville 1565; site now occupied by parochial church		50°49′02″N 0°11′25″E
Winchelsea Black Friars, earlier site		Dominican Friars (under the Visitation of London) founded 1318 on the south cliff; new site granted by the king 1358 due to threat from sea; transferred to new site (see immediately below) 1358	Winchelsey Friary	
Winchelsea Blackfriars		Dominican Friars (under the Visitation of London) (community founded at earlier site (see immediately above) 1318); transferred here 1358; dissolved 1538; granted to William Gifford and Michael Wildbore 1544/5	The Priory Church of the Blessed Virgin Mary, Winchelsea ____________________; Winchelsey Friary	50°55′37″N 0°42′24″E; 50°55′28″N 0°42′24″E (alleged)
Winchelsea Greyfriars, New Town		Franciscan Friars (under the Custody of London) (community founded at Old Town (see immediately below) before 1242 (before 1253)); transferred here 1283-7; dissolved 1538		50°55′19″N 0°42′37″E
Winchelsea Greyfriars, Old Town		Franciscan Friars (under the Custody of London) founded before 1242 (before 1253); transferred to new site (see immediately above) 1283–7		
Withyham Priory		Benedictine monks alien house: grange(?) dependent on Mortain and Marmoutier; land apparently granted by Robert, Count of Mortain before 1086; founded 1249; dissolved 1413; granted to the New College, Hastings (Warbleton); dissolved 1536; granted to King's College, Cambridge		51°05′42″N 0°07′35″E

== See also ==
- List of monastic houses in England
