= 1525 =

1525 in various calendars
- Gregorian calendar: 1525; MDXXV
- Ab urbe condita: 2278
- Armenian calendar: 974; ԹՎ ՋՀԴ
- Assyrian calendar: 6275
- Balinese saka calendar: 1446–1447
- Bengali calendar: 931–932
- Berber calendar: 2475
- English Regnal year: 16 Hen. 8 – 17 Hen. 8
- Buddhist calendar: 2069
- Burmese calendar: 887
- Byzantine calendar: 7033–7034
- Chinese calendar: 甲申年 (Wood Monkey); 4222 or 4015 — to — 乙酉年 (Wood Rooster); 4223 or 4016
- Coptic calendar: 1241–1242
- Discordian calendar: 2691
- Ethiopian calendar: 1517–1518
- Hebrew calendar: 5285–5286
- Hindu calendars
- Vikram Samvat: 1581–1582
- Shaka Samvat: 1446–1447
- Kali Yuga: 4625–4626
- Holocene calendar: 11525
- Igbo calendar: 525–526
- Iranian calendar: 903–904
- Islamic calendar: 931–932
- Japanese calendar: Daiei 5 (大永５年)
- Javanese calendar: 1443–1444
- Julian calendar: 1525; MDXXV
- Korean calendar: 3858
- Minguo calendar: 387 before ROC 民前387年
- Nanakshahi calendar: 57
- Thai solar calendar: 2067–2068
- Tibetan calendar: ཤིང་ཕོ་སྤྲེ་ལོ་ (male Wood-Monkey); 1651 or 1270 or 498 — to — ཤིང་མོ་བྱ་ལོ་ (female Wood-Bird); 1652 or 1271 or 499

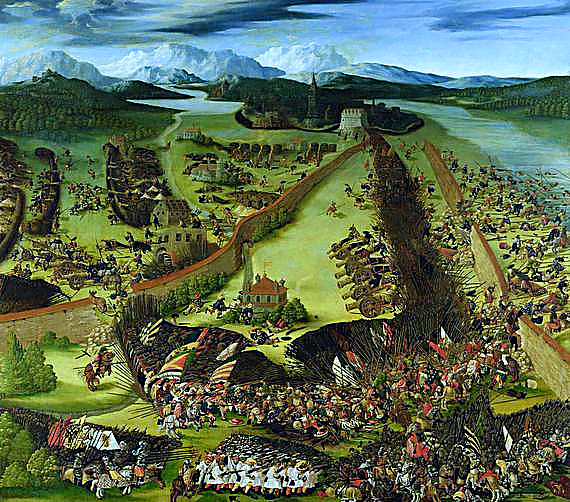
February 24: The Battle of Pavia is fought in Italy and King Francis of France becomes a POW.

Year 1525 (MDXXV) was a common year starting on Sunday of the Julian calendar.

== Events ==
=== January–March ===
- January 21 – The Anabaptist Movement is born when Conrad Grebel, Felix Manz, George Blaurock, and about a dozen others baptize each other in the home of Manz's mother on Neustadt-Gasse, Zürich, breaking a thousand-year tradition of church-state union.
- February 24 – Battle of Pavia: German and Spanish forces under Charles de Lannoy and the Marquis of Pescara defeat the French army, and capture Francis I of France, after his horse is wounded by Cesare Hercolani. While Francis is imprisoned in Lombardy and then transferred to Madrid, the first attempts to form a Franco-Ottoman alliance with Suleiman the Magnificent against the Habsburg Empire are made.
- February 28 – The last Aztec Emperor, Cuauhtémoc, is killed by Hernán Cortés.
- March 20 – In the German town of Memmingen, the pamphlet The Twelve Articles: The Just and Fundamental Articles of All the Peasantry and Tenants of Spiritual and Temporal Powers by Whom They Think Themselves Oppressed is published, the first human rights related document written in Europe.

=== April–June ===
- April 4 – German Peasants' War in the Holy Roman Empire: Battle of Leipheim – The peasants suffer great losses when they are attacked by Georg, Truchsess von Waldburg and the town of Leipheim is forced to surrender. Four peasant leaders are beheaded, including Jakob Wehe and Ulrich Schoen.
- April 10 – Albert, Duke of Prussia commits Prussian Homage.
- May 14–15 – German Peasants' War: Battle of Frankenhausen – Insurgent peasants led by radical pastor Thomas Müntzer are defeated. Following the defeat, Müntzer is executed in front of the gates of Mühlhausen.
- June 4 – 1525 Bayham Abbey riot; Villagers from Kent and Sussex, England riot and occupy Bayham Old Abbey for a week in protest against Cardinal Thomas Wolsey's order to suppress the monastery in order to fund two colleges founded by him.
- June 13 – Martin Luther marries ex-nun Katharina von Bora. The painter Lucas Cranach the Elder is one of the witnesses.
- June 18 – Henry VIII of England appoints his six-year-old illegitimate son Henry FitzRoy Duke of Richmond and Somerset.
- June 23–24 – German Peasants' War: Battle of Pfeddersheim – Peasants are defeated in the last significant action of the war, in which over 75,000 peasants have been killed.

=== July–September ===
- July 29 – Santa Marta, the first city in Colombia, is founded by Spanish conquistador Rodrigo de Bastidas.
- August 13 – The coronation of Sophie of Pomerania as Queen consort of Denmark takes place in Copenhagen, a little more than a year after her husband's coronation as King Frederick I. She is granted Lolland and Falster, the castles in Kiel and Plön, and several villages in Holstein for her income.
- August 30 – The French ambassador to England and King Henry VIII sign the Treaty of the More at a castle, "The More", in Hertfordshire.
- September 14 – In Switzerland, the burning of most of the book collection of the Stiftsbibliothek of the Grossmünster Abbey in Zurich begins, by order of Huldrych Zwingli, as part of the Swiss Reformation. After 20 days of destruction of a collection built since 1259 for over 250 years, only 470 volumes are left.
- September 24 – Jeremias I is restored to the position of Ecumenical Patriarch of Constantinople, leader of the Eastern Orthodox Christian church, by order of the Ottoman Empire Sultan Suleiman the Magnificent.

=== October–December ===
- October 10 – the Earl of Angus, Scotland's Lord Warden of the Marches in charge of border security on the boundary with England, is able to work out a three-year peace treaty with the Kingdom of England and signs the initial agreement at the English border town of Berwick-upon-Tweed.
- November 25 – Charles V, Holy Roman Emperor acting in his capacity as the King of Spain, issues an edict ordering the expulsion or conversion of the remaining Muslims in the Crown of Aragon, similar to that issued for the Crown of Castile by Queen Isabella in 1502. The order applies to the Kingdom of Valencia and the Principality of Catalonia.
- December 8 – A second edict is issued in Spain directing Spanish Muslims to show proof of baptism as Christians or to leave by the deadline of December 31 (for Valencia) or January 26 (for Aragon and Catalonia).
- December 31 – The deadline for Spanish Muslims to convert to Christianity in the Valencia is reached, after which remaining Muslims, or those who harbor them as fugitives, becomes punishable by forced exile, imprisonment or death.
- December – The first French ambassador to reach the Sublime Porte, Jean Frangipani, sets out for Constantinople.

=== Date unknown ===
- Mixco Viejo, capital of the Pocomans Maya State, falls to the Spanish conquistadores of Pedro de Alvarado (in modern-day Guatemala) after a three-month siege.
- European-brought diseases sweep through the Andes, killing thousands, including the Inca.
- The Bubonic plague spreads in southern France.
- Printing of the first edition of William Tyndale's New Testament Bible translation into English in Cologne is interrupted by anti-Lutheran forces and Tyndale flees to Worms (finished copies reach England in 1526).
- Printing of Huldrych Zwingli's New Testament 'Zürich Bible' translation into German by Christoph Froschauer begins.
- The Navarre witch trials (1525-1526) begins.
- The Chinese Ministry of War under the Ming dynasty orders ships having more than one mast sailing along the southeast coast to be seized, investigated, and destroyed; this in an effort to curb piracy and limit private commercial trade abroad.
- Kasur established as a city by the Kheshgi tribe of Pashtuns from Kabul who migrate to the region in 1525 from Afghanistan.
- The Age of Samael ends, and the Age of Gabriel begins, according to Johannes Trithemius.

== Births ==
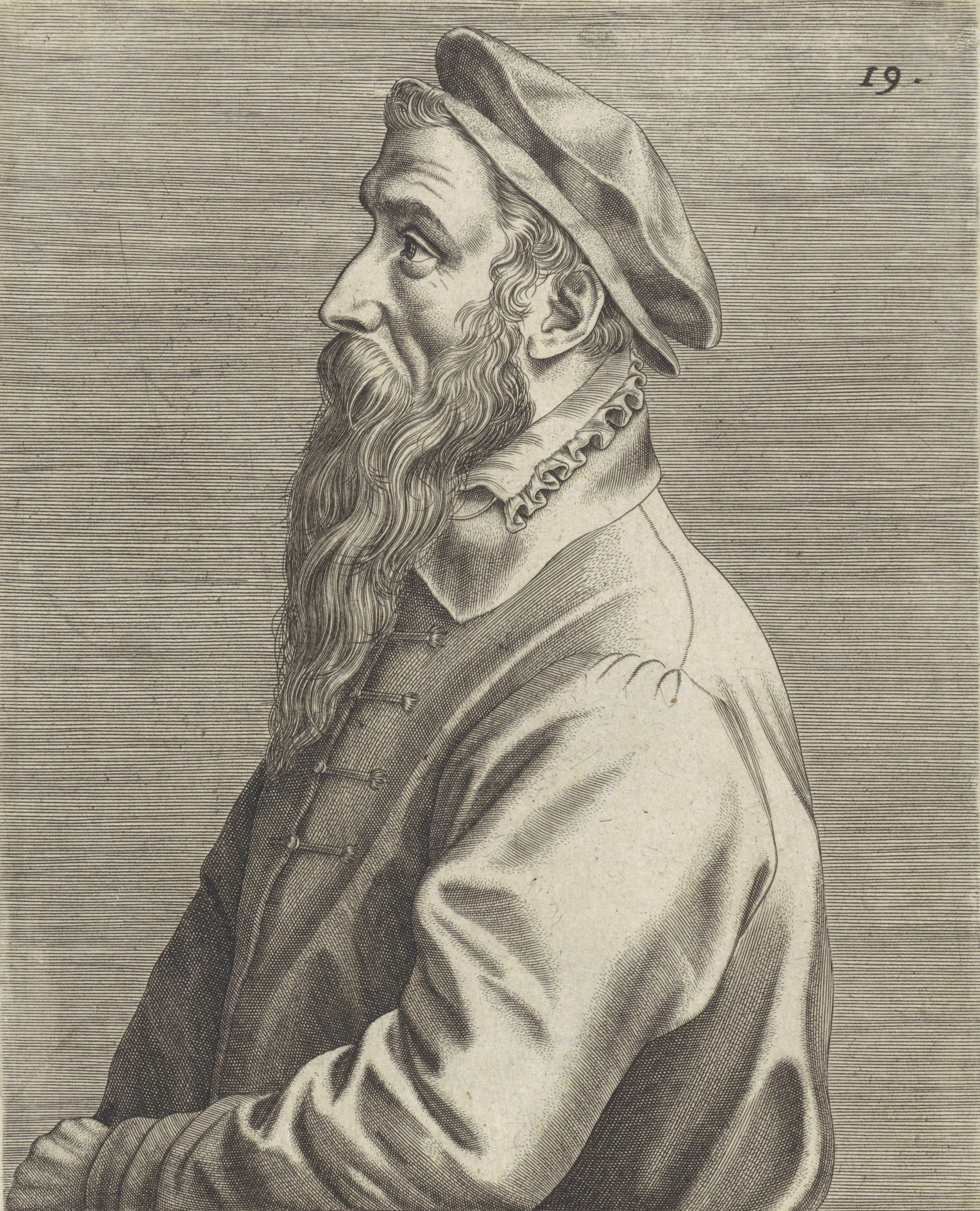
Pieter Bruegel the Elder

- January 29 – Lelio Sozzini, Italian Renaissance humanist and anti-Trinitarian reformer (d. 1562)
- February 5 – Juraj Drašković, Croatian Catholic cardinal (d. 1587)
- March 19 – Caspar Cruciger the Younger, German theologian (d. 1597)
- March 25 – Richard Edwardes, English choral musician, playwright and poet (d. 1566)
- March 26 – Katharina of Hanau, Countess of Wied, German noblewoman (d. 1581)
- June 1 – Caspar Peucer, German reformer (d. 1602)
- June 29 – Peter Agricola, German Renaissance humanist, educator, classical scholar, theologian, diplomat and statesman (d. 1585)
- September 1 – Christoffer Valkendorff, Danish politician (d. 1601)
- September 11 – John George, Elector of Brandenburg (d. 1598)
- September 25 – Steven Borough, English explorer (d. 1584)
- November 7 – Georg Cracow, German lawyer and politician (d. 1575)
- December 1 – Tadeáš Hájek, Czech astronomer (d. 1600)
- December 23 – John Albert I, Duke of Mecklenburg (d. 1576)
- date unknown – Maharal of Prague, Talmudic scholar, Jewish mystic and philosopher (d. 1609)
- probable
  - Pieter Bruegel the Elder, Flemish painter (d. 1569)
  - Baldassare Donato, Italian composer and singer (d. 1603)
  - Giovanni Pierluigi da Palestrina, Italian composer (d. 1594)
  - Hans Staden, German soldier and sailor (d. 1579)

== Deaths ==
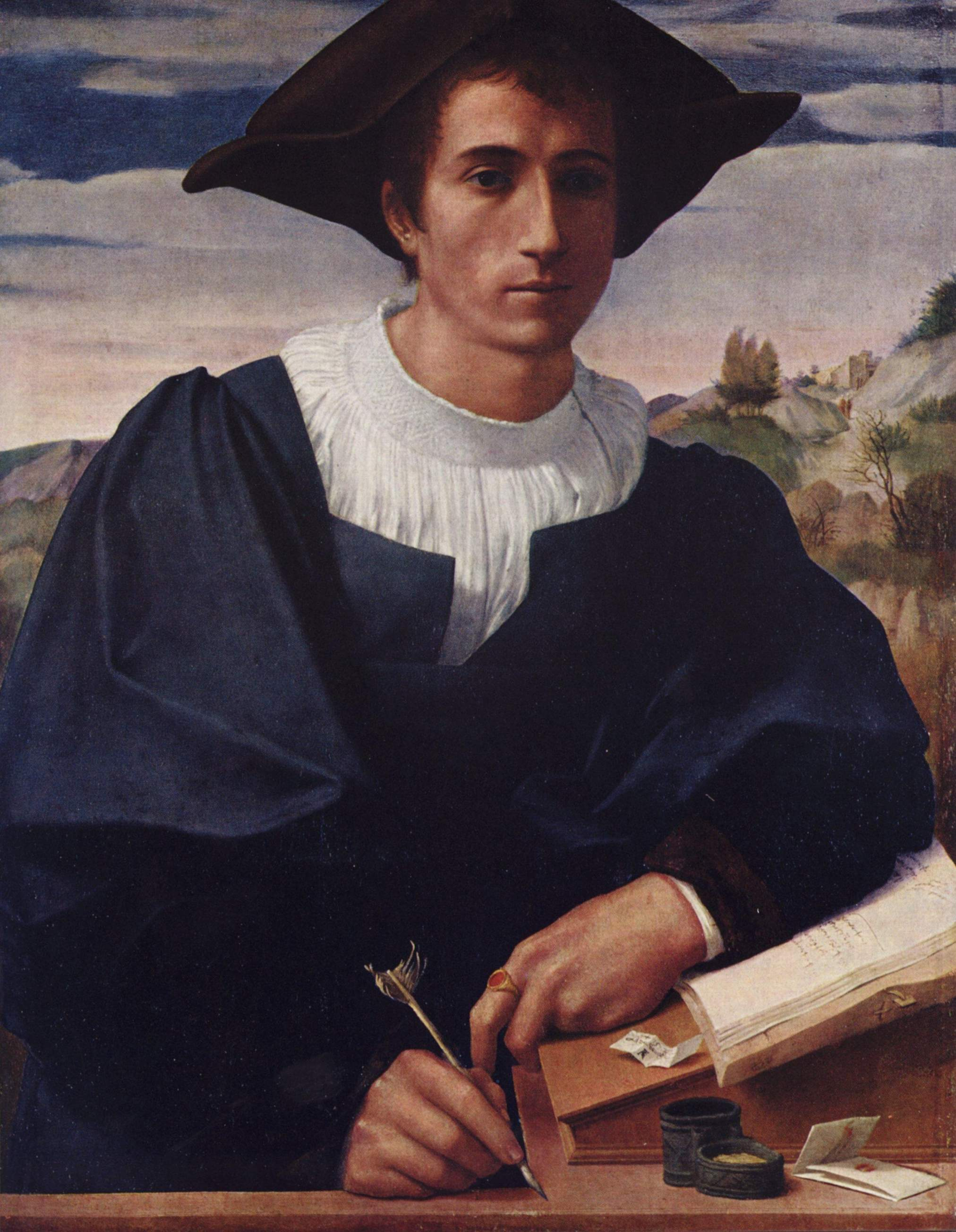
Franciabigio

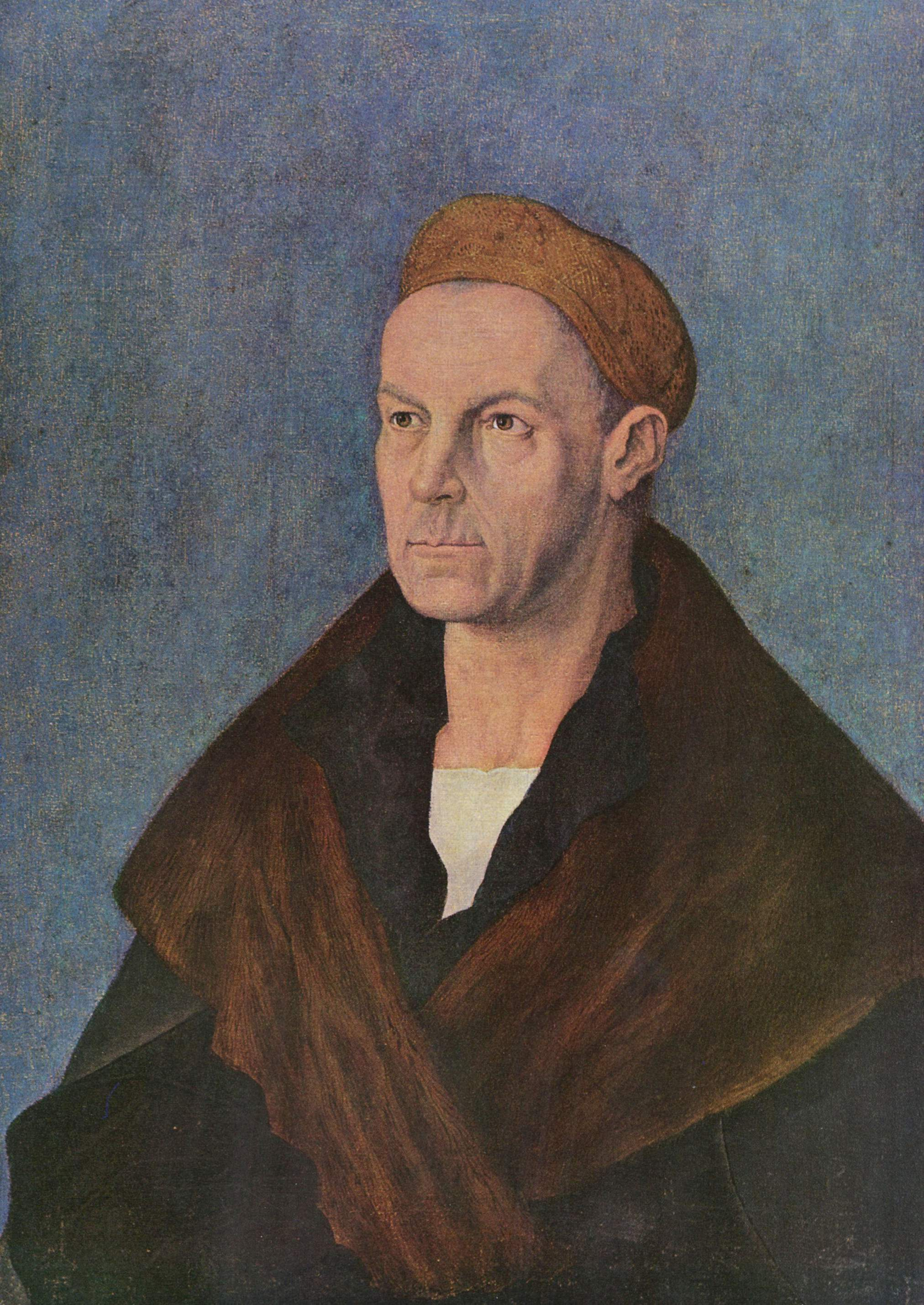
Jakob Fugger

- January 14 – Franciabigio, Florentine painter (b. 1482)
- February 24 (in action at the Battle of Pavia)
  - Guillaume Gouffier, seigneur de Bonnivet, French soldier (b. c. 1488)
  - Jacques de La Palice, French nobleman and military officer (b. 1470)
  - Richard de la Pole, last Yorkist claimant to the English throne (b. 1480)
  - Louis II de la Trémoille, French military leader (b. 1460)
  - Bartolomeo Fanfulla, Italian mercenary (b. 1477)
  - René de Brosse, French noble
- February 28 – Cuauhtémoc, last Tlatoani of the Aztec Empire (b. c. 1495)
- April 2 or April 3 – Giovanni di Bernardo Rucellai, Italian Renaissance man of letters (b. 1475)
- May 5 – Frederick III, Elector of Saxony (b. 1463)
- May 12 – Anna of Mecklenburg-Schwerin, Mecklenburgian royal (b. 1485)
- May 18 – Pietro Pomponazzi, Italian philosopher (b. 1462)
- May 27 – Thomas Müntzer, German pastor and rebel leader (b. 1489) (executed)
- July 5 – Johann of Brandenburg-Ansbach, Viceroy of Valencia, German noble (b. 1493)
- July 22 – Richard Wingfield, English diplomat (b. c. 1456)
- August 4 – Andrea della Robbia, Italian artist (b. 1435)
- October 24 – Thomas Dacre, 2nd Baron Dacre, Knight of Henry VIII of England (b. 1467)
- November 17 – Eleanor of Viseu, queen of João II of Portugal (b. 1458)
- December 30 – Jakob Fugger, German banker (b. 1459)
- probable
  - Jean Lemaire de Belges, Walloon poet and historian (b. 1473)
  - Anna Bielke, Swedish noble and commander (b. 1490)
