= Withyham Priory =

Coordinates: 51.0950°N 0.1264°E

Withyham Priory was a Benedictine monastic house in East Sussex, extant in 1086 and dissolved in 1413.

== History ==
Robert, Count of Mortain, some time before 1086, gave to the Priory of Mortain, a cell of Marmoutier, eight burgages in Pevensey worth 5s. 6d., and probably also the manor of Withyham and the hamlet of Blackham in that parish. These two estates were temporarily usurped by Walter de Richardeville, but were restored to the monks about 1095, and further confirmed to them by Robert's son William, as count, about 1100. A single monk appears to have been put in charge of their Sussex estates and dignified with the title of Prior of Withyham at least as early as 1249.

In 1325 the monks of Mortain, by their proctor the prior of Withyham, had property in the parish worth £26 15s., and in 1370 are returned as holding the manor and advowson of Withyham, the manor being farmed at £20.

Rather earlier than this a return of alien religious mentions that the Prior of Withyham was an Englishman and had no fellow monk. The grant made by Edward III in 1372 to John of Gaunt of those possessions in Sussex which afterwards became part of the Duchy of Lancaster included the advowson of this alien cell, which only existed for another forty years, being suppressed with the other alien houses in 1413, and given first to the New Priory of Hastings, and afterwards to King's College, Cambridge.

== See also ==
- List of monastic houses in East Sussex

== Sources ==
- Page, William, ed. (1907). "The Priory of Withyham". The Victoria History of the County of Sussex. Vol. 2. London: Archibald Constable & Co. Ltd. pp. 123–124.
