= St Mary and St Peter's Church, Wilmington =

Coordinates: 50.8175°N 0.1906°E

St Mary and St Peter's Church
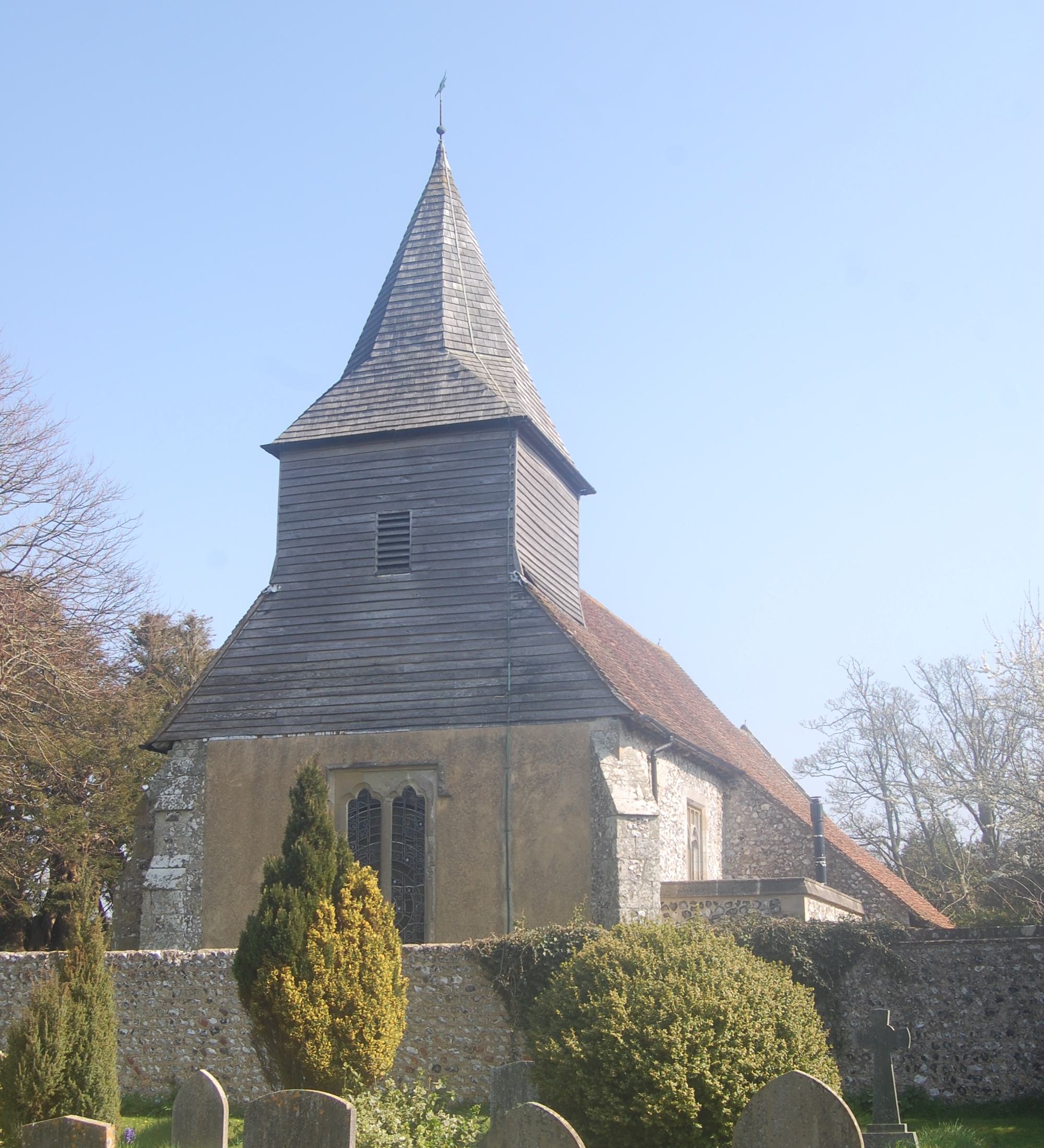
- The church in 2022
- St Mary and St Peter's Church
- Location: Wilmington, East Sussex
- Country: England
- Denomination: Anglican
- Website: www.berwickchurch.org.uk/wilmington%20church%20guide.html

History
- Status: Active
- Founded: 1366
- Dedication: St Andrew

Architecture
- Architect: Paley and Austin (restoration)
- Architectural type: Church
- Style: Norman, Gothic, Gothic Revival

Administration
- Province: Canterbury
- Archdiocese: Lewes and Hastings
- Diocese: Chichester
- Deanery: Lewes and Seaford
- Parish: Wilmington

Listed Building – Grade I
- Official name: The Parish Church of St Mary and St Peter
- Designated: 30 August 1966
- Reference no.: 1028509

St Mary and St Peter's Church is in the village of Wilmington, East Sussex, England. It is an active Anglican parish church on the deanery of Lewes and Seaford, the archdeaconry of Lewes and Hastings, and the diocese of Chichester. Founded in the late 11th century to serve villagers in a rural area at the foot of the South Downs, it also functioned as a priory church for the monks from the adjacent Wilmington Priory, to which it was physically connected. The building has "benefited from sympathetic restoration" over the centuries—including a series of works by prominent architects Paley and Austin in the Victorian era, and internal renovation after a fire in the early 21st century. The church is recorded in the National Heritage List for England as a designated Grade I listed building.

== History ==
After the Norman Conquest in 1066, monks from Grestain Abbey, a Benedictine monastery in Normandy, took possession of the land around the village of Wilmington. They founded Wilmington Priory to administer their territory, and two or three monks lived there. It was never a large community, and no separate abbey church was ever built; the monks instead shared the chancel of village church. This was in existence by 1100 and served the farmers and villagers of Winelton, as it was known at the time. The church was connected to the priory by a cloister. In common with other alien priories in England, Wilmington Priory was suppressed by King Henry V in 1414 and fell into ruins. Thereafter, the church functioned solely as a parish church. A vast yew tree in the churchyard, scientifically dated as 1,600 years old and with a girth of 23 feet (7.0 m), suggests that the site was considered sacred to pre-Christian people. The existence of a "strange ... gargoyle-like" figure known as the Wilmington Madonna—originally on the outside wall but now preserved in the chancel—may also be evidence of pagan worship in the area.

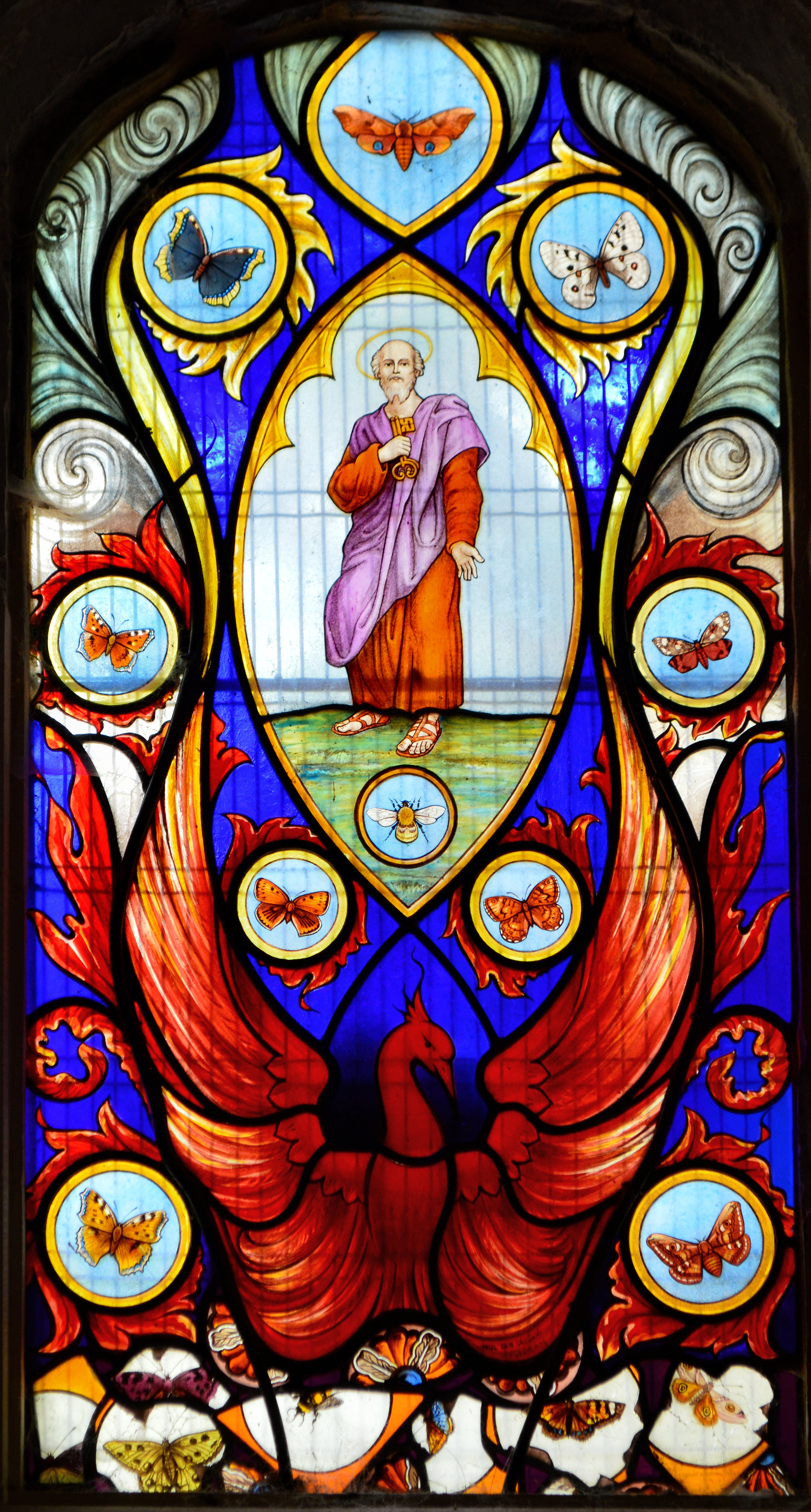
The new bee and butterfly window

During the 13th century a north chapel or transept was added towards the east end of the nave, and a two-bay south aisle was built. The aisle had the appearance of a transept and was separated from the body of the church by a two-bay arcade. In the following century the nave was rebuilt. The north porch was added, and the east window was inserted, during the 15th century. Around the same time, diagonal buttresses were added at the east end—possibly because the insertion of new windows in the chancel had weakened the walls. In 1882–83 the church was restored by the Lancaster architects Paley and Austin. They replaced the two-bay south aisle with a full-length aisle, removed the west gallery, and added new floors, an altar with altar rails, stalls, a lectern, and a reading desk, and reseated the church. They also repaired the north transept and added the "elaborate" chancel arch. The restoration cost £1,790 (equivalent to £190,000 as of 2025). (Note: Paley and Austin, being based in Lancaster, worked mainly in the northwest of England, although they did carry out three restorations near Eastbourne. The Duke of Devonshire was a major landowner in the area, and was the patron of the living of Wilmington church. The architects had carried out work for the Duke at his country house, Holker Hall, and it is likely that he played a part in their gaining the commission to restore this church.) In 2002 the north transept, by then in use as a vestry, was severely damaged by a fire and the organ was destroyed. The damage was repaired and the church was rededicated in 2004. A well-regarded stained glass window depicting British butterflies and bees, badly damaged by the fire, was replaced by a new design which kept the same theme but added images of Saint Peter and a phoenix rising from a fire.

== Architecture ==
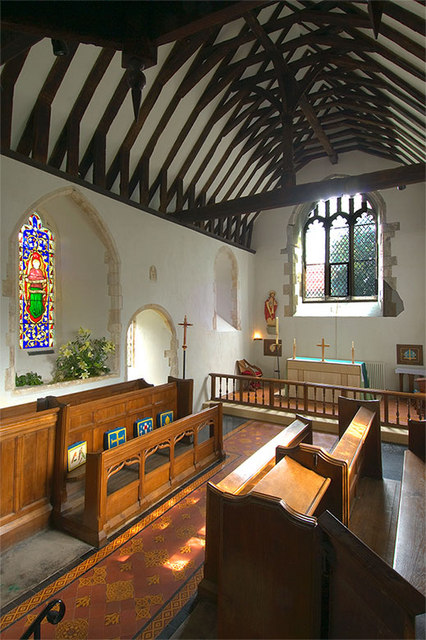
The church has a king post roof.

The plan of the church consists of a nave with a north porch, a south aisle, a north transept, and a chancel. The walls are of flint with small areas of rendering, and are in good structural condition. Although very thick, the window openings are splayed to allow more light in. At the west end of the church is a "pretty" weatherboarded bellcote with a shingled broach spire. The chancel is Norman, with two original round-headed windows, a carved triangular string-course and traces of a round-headed south doorway. The nave windows are in Decorated Gothic style, and the east window is Perpendicular Gothic. There is evidence of blank arcading around some of the windows—a feature also seen at St Michael and All Angels Church in nearby Little Horsted. The high chancel arch, inserted by Paley and Austin, is in 13th-century (Early English Gothic) style. There is also a king post roof.

Inside the church, the wooden pulpit is Jacobean, dating from about 1610. It has a back panel and a sounding board. The "splendid" and unusual fitting contrasts with the simplicity of the surrounding Norman architecture. The font dates from the 14th century, and consists of plain square bowl supported by a central column and four corner shafts. In the chancel are two square-headed aumbries, and set in the north chancel wall is a weathered piece of sculpture dating from the 11th or 13th century; this was moved from the outside of the church in 1948. On the north wall of the nave are the remains of a 17th-century painted inscription, and on the south wall is a painted panel bearing the Royal arms of Queen Victoria. An Elizabethan-era monument with Classical-style details stands in the south aisle. An unusual feature from the church's earliest days is a set of inward-facing stone seats attached to the inner walls of the chancel. Such benches were often found in 11th-century churches, albeit usually in the nave, but in most cases they were removed during later rebuilding work.

== The church today ==
St Mary and St Peter's Church was listed at Grade I on 30 August 1966. Such buildings are defined as being of "exceptional interest" and greater than national importance. As of February 2001, it was one of 47 Grade I listed buildings, and 2,173 listed buildings of all grades, in the district of Wealden.

The parish, which has a population of about 200, covers a rural area north of the South Downs. The A27 road runs west–east through the area. It forms part of the united benefice of Arlington, Berwick, Selmeston-with-Alciston and Wilmington, which covers the Anglican churches in those five downland villages. They are served by a rector and an assistant priest, and each church has its own churchwardens.

Services, using the Book of Common Prayer in alternate weeks, are offered on Sunday mornings, and on alternate Mondays there is an Evening Prayer service.

== See also ==
- Grade I listed buildings in East Sussex
- List of current places of worship in Wealden
- List of ecclesiastical works by Paley and Austin
