= Long Man =

Civil parish in East Sussex, England

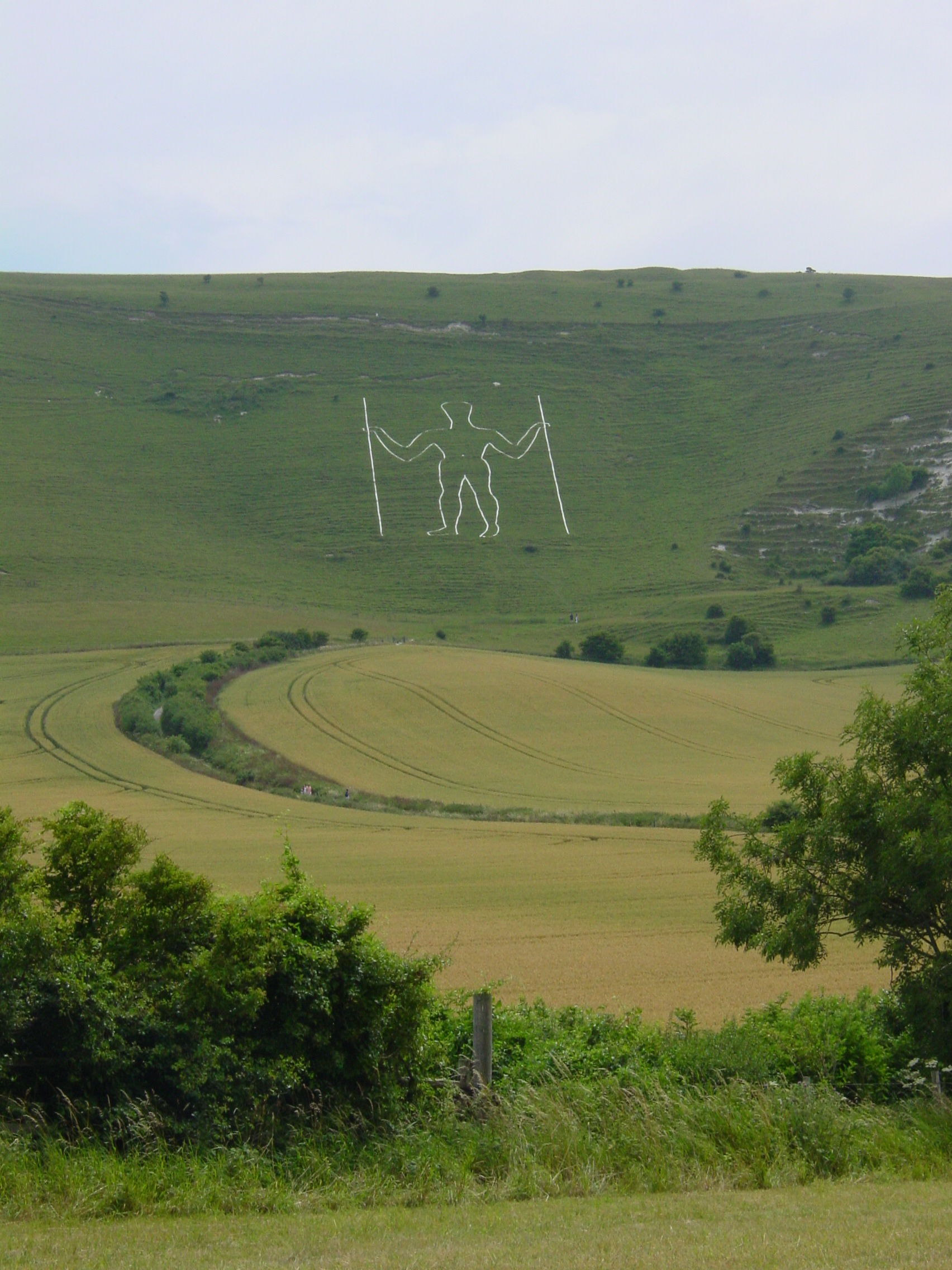
- The Long Man of Wilmington

- Location within East Sussex
- Area: 16.1 km^{2} (6.2 sq mi)
- Population: 447 (in 2011)
  - Density: 66/sq mi (25/km^{2})
- OS grid reference: TQ553063
  - London: 48 miles (77 km) NNW
- District: Wealden
- Shire county: East Sussex
- Region: South East
- Country: England
- Sovereign state: United Kingdom
- Post town: POLEGATE
- Postcode district: BN26
- Dialling code: 01323
- Police: Sussex
- Fire: East Sussex
- Ambulance: South East Coast
- UK Parliament: Lewes

Long Man is a civil parish in the Wealden District of East Sussex, England, which includes the villages of Wilmington, Milton Street and Folkington. The parish is named after the Long Man of Wilmington, a 69.2-metre (227 ft) chalk figure in the parish.

The parish extends far from the left bank of the modest River Cuckmere where it starts to cut through the South Downs; the Cuckmere Valley lies immediately south. The A27 trunk road crosses the parish from west to east. The Wealdway long distance footpath also passes through the parish. The parish was formed on 1 April 1999 from "Folkington" and "Wilmington" parishes.

== Settlements ==
=== Wilmington ===
50.818°N 0.192°E

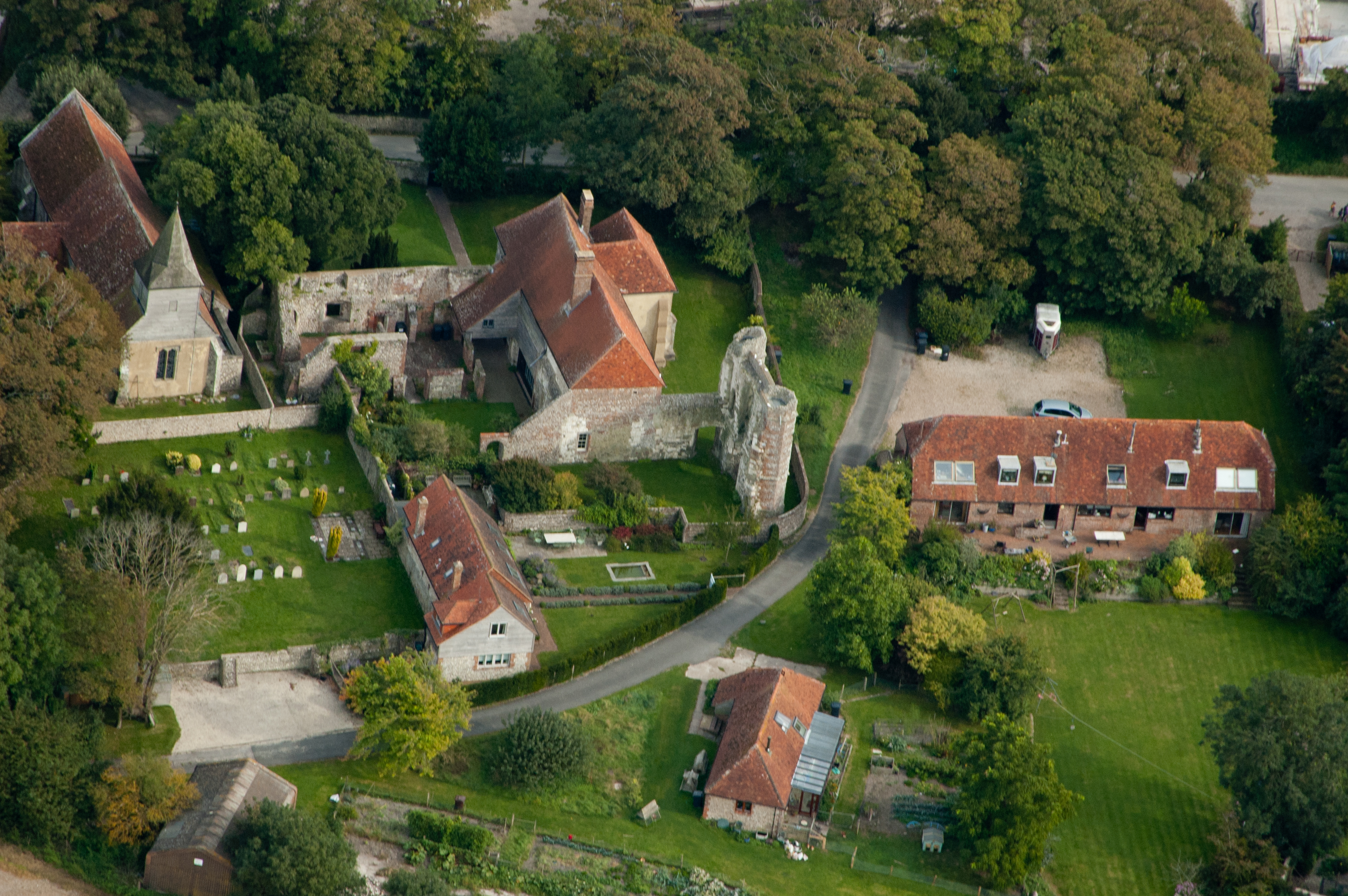
Ruins of Wilmington Priory at centre; St Mary and St Peter's Church, Wilmington, is at top left.

Wilmington is about 6 miles north-west of Eastbourne in East Sussex. In the village there is the 12th-century Parish Church of St Mary and St Peter; adjoining it are the ruins of the 12th-century Wilmington Priory. The local public house is The Giant's Rest. The Wishing Well Tea Gardens are some of the oldest in Sussex, established c. 1900. The hotel Crossways is an archetypal Georgian brick and stone house, once home to the parents of international culinary guru, Elizabeth David.

The place-name 'Wilmington' is first attested in the Domesday Book of 1086, where it appears as Wineltone and Wilminte. It appears as Wilmetun in 1212 in the Book of Fees. The name means 'the town or settlement of Wighelm's or Wilhelm's people'.

=== Folkington ===
Folkington village lies beyond a green buffer, east of Wilmington. The church is dedicated to St Peter ad Vincula and was formerly under the patronage of Earl De La Warr. Folkington Manor was the seat of the Thomas family: the current manor house dates from the 1830s.

Current and former residents include broadcaster David Dimbleby, Bridget Monckton, 11th Lady Ruthven of Freeland and Harry Brünjes.

=== Milton Street ===
This hamlet is home to the Sussex Ox pub. Milton Street was the setting of an episode of The Goon Show in which determined efforts are made to extinguish the sun.

== Landmarks ==
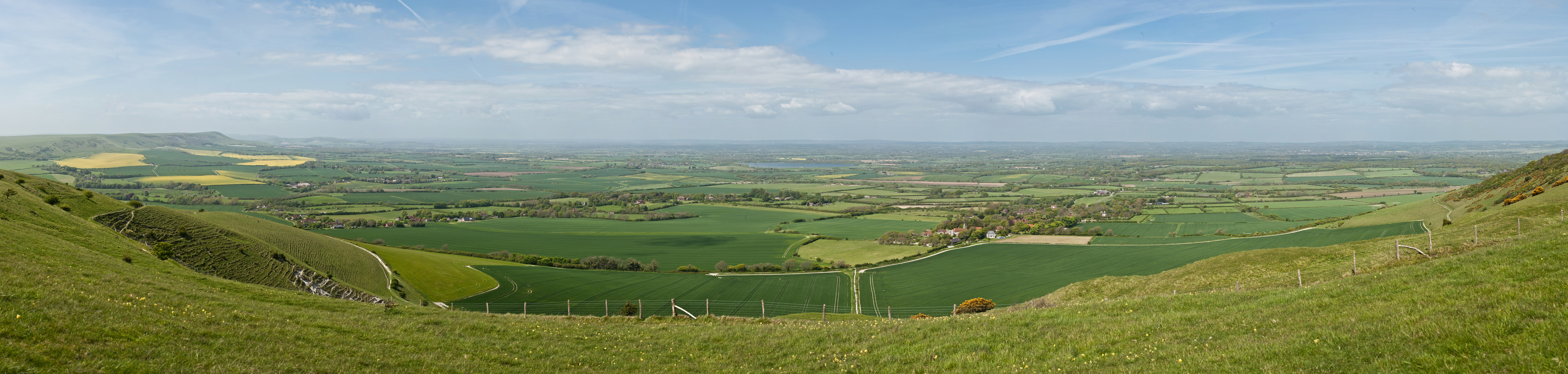
As semi-panorama of the Long Man civil parish region. On the far left is the village of Milton Street, in the centre-right is the village of Wilmington, and in the distance on the far-right is Hailsham.

Milton Gate Marsh, a Site of Special Scientific Interest, lies within the parish. It is a wetland area of biological importance for invertebrates and breeding birds. Amongst the fauna found here is the nationally rare hoverfly Cheilosia chrysocoma. Another SSSI is Wilmington Downs, which is of biological interest as an area of rare chalk grassland. The area is also of archaeological interest as it contains the Long Man chalk figure.

== Governance ==
The lowest level of government is the Long Man parish council which meets once a month; is responsible for local amenities such as the provision of litter bins, bus shelters and allotments. They also provide a voice into the district council meetings. For elections, the parish is divided into three wards, Wilmington (four seats), Milton Street (two seats) and Folkington (one seat).

Wealden District Council is the second tier of local government with services such as refuse collection, planning consent, leisure amenities and council tax collection. Long Man is in the East Dean ward, along with the Friston and Cuckmere Valley parishes. The single seat was won in the May 2007 election by the Conservative candidate.

East Sussex County Council is the top tier of local government, providing education, libraries, social services and highways. Long Man falls within the Polegate, Willingdon and East Dean division which elects two councillors.

Long Man is represented in the UK Parliament by the Lewes constituency. The current serving MP is the Liberal Democrat James MacCleary who won the seat in the 2024 general election.
