= Alfriston Market Cross =

Market cross in Alfriston, UK

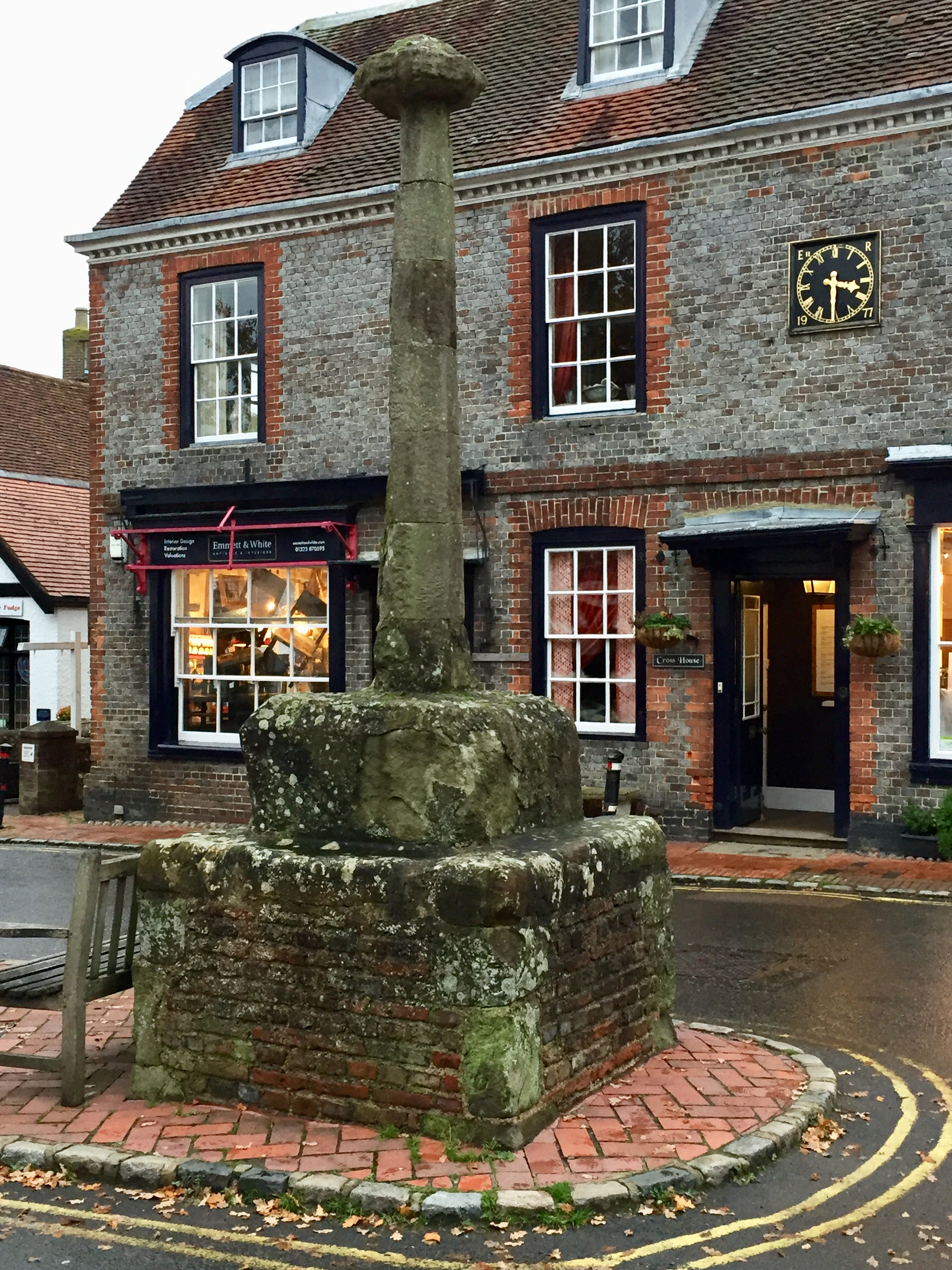
- The market cross in Waterloo Square, Alfriston
- Interactive map of Alfriston Market Cross
- Type: Market cross
- Location: Waterloo Square, Alfriston, Sussex, UK
- Coordinates: 50°48′29.1″N 0°9′23.7″E
- OS grid reference: TQ 52042 03164 (Listing NGR: TQ 52039 03182)
- Built: Early 15th century?
- Restored: 1955-56
- Restored by: Alfriston Parish Council

Listed Building
- Official name: The Market Cross
- Type: Grade I
- Designated: 13 October 1952
- Reference no.: 1353268

Alfriston Market Cross is the only remaining market cross in Sussex, other than the elaborate market cross in Chichester. It is formed of a stone base and shaft on a brick plinth; the cross itself is missing, but the shaft is topped with a ‘cornice-like’ stone. The cross is a Grade I listed building (List Entry Number 1353268).

A charter for a market at Alfriston was granted in 1406; the market cross was probably erected at about that time. Little, if anything, of the original cross, remains. The cross was altered in the 19th century; twice repaired after being damaged in the early 20th century; and rebuilt in 1955–56 after it was smashed when a lorry reversed into it. Notwithstanding the rebuilding, the cross is a rare feature within Sussex.

== History ==
A market at Alfriston, then part of the Duchy of Lancaster, was granted by a charter dated 24 May 1406. The market was to be held every Tuesday. The charter was granted by King Henry IV to the king and his heirs as Dukes of Lancaster, to be held "at the king’s town". The charter also granted two fairs, to be held on the vigil and feast of Andrew the Apostle (30 November) and the vigil and feast of Philip and James (1 May) (the ‘vigil’ was the day before the saint's feast day). It is likely the market cross was erected around the time the charter was granted.

Replacement in the 19th and 20th centuries means that only the socket stone and the lowest stone of the shaft may be medieval survivals. The official listing of the market cross by Historic England states ‘the cornice-like stone at the top was added in 1833, when the old steps were removed’. However, other accounts suggest the steps were removed, and the current brick base built, in the 1870s, at the time St Andrew's Church was being restored. Some sources suggest the ‘cornice-like stone at the top’ is a representation of a ‘shepherd’s crown’, a flint fossil of a sea urchin, carried by downland shepherds for good luck.

In the First World War, and again in the Second World War, the cross was considerably damaged when drunken Canadian soldiers climbed it. A metal core was inserted in the stone shaft when it was repaired. A photograph from before 1900 shows the stone shaft intact; later post-war photographs show the rather crude repairs to the shaft where it had been broken.

The market cross was first listed on the National Heritage List for England on 13 October 1952.

=== Destruction and restoration of the market cross, 1955-56 ===
On Tuesday, 15 November 1955 a three-ton lorry reversed into the market cross and smashed it to pieces. Alfriston Parish Council decided to restore the cross once again, and the work was undertaken by a local building firm, H. Wilson.

Initially, there was some difficulty in matching the sandstone from which the cross was built, which was thought to have come ‘from the seashore at Eastbourne’. However, Colonel R. V. Gwynne, the chairman of Eastbourne magistrates, realised that the stonework of an ancient tithe barn which stood on his land in the grounds of Wilmington Priory was an almost exact match both in colouring and texture. Therefore, he gave several blocks of the sandstone from the barn for the restoration.

(A report about the restoration of the cross in the Eastbourne Gazette of Wednesday 7 December 1955 noted that ‘When the Sussex Archaeological Trust took over the maintenance of Wilmington Priory it considered the ancient [tithe] barn to be too advanced in decay to be taken over, and some time ago Colonel Gwynne had the colossal oak beams dismantled and placed in store'.)

To minimise the potential damage from future accidents, a solid concrete base was constructed within the rebuilt brick plinth, and the metal core of the shaft, inserted when it was last repaired, was retained.

The restoration was complete by August 1956, having been delayed by bad weather.

The ‘County Diary’ feature in the Sussex Agricultural Express of Friday 10 August 1956 noted that ‘The new shaft looks thicker than the original because the old one was worn by the years. The builders had the guide of the base and top to shape the shaft to, and anyone who did not know of the disaster would merely think it had been restored’. The difference in the thickness of the shaft can be seen when comparing photographs of the market cross from before and after the accident in 1955.

== The Ship of Theseus paradox ==
In the Sussex Extensive Urban Survey (EUS) Historic Character Assessment Report for Alfriston (March 2008), the author, Roland Harris, remarked ‘The market cross at Alfriston may be a late medieval survival, although with a strong hint of the ship of Theseus paradox’; however, he recognised that ‘Not withstanding the rebuilding, the cross is a rare feature … within Sussex’.

In the metaphysics of identity, the Ship of Theseus is a thought experiment that raises the question of whether an object that has had all its components replaced remains fundamentally the same object.
