= Rye Austin Friary =

Monastery in Rye, East Sussex, England

Coordinates: 50.9517832°N 0.7344908°E

Rye Austin Friary was an Augustinian friary in Conduit Street, Rye, East Sussex, England.

Founded at an earlier site on the East cliff in 1364, the community transferred to the new site in town c.1380, but was dissolved in 1538 as part of the Dissolution of the Monasteries.

The only building remaining intact is the friary chapel, known as the Monastery, which is a grade II listed two storey building. It is scheduled as an Ancient Monument and, owing to its poor condition, it is also on the Heritage at Risk Register.

The chapel building has served a number of purposes over the years: it has been a Salvation Army barracks, a community hall and most recently a pottery workshop.

== See also ==
- List of monastic houses in East Sussex
