= Wilmington Priory =

Monastery in East Sussex, UK

Coordinates: 50.8173°N 0.1903°E

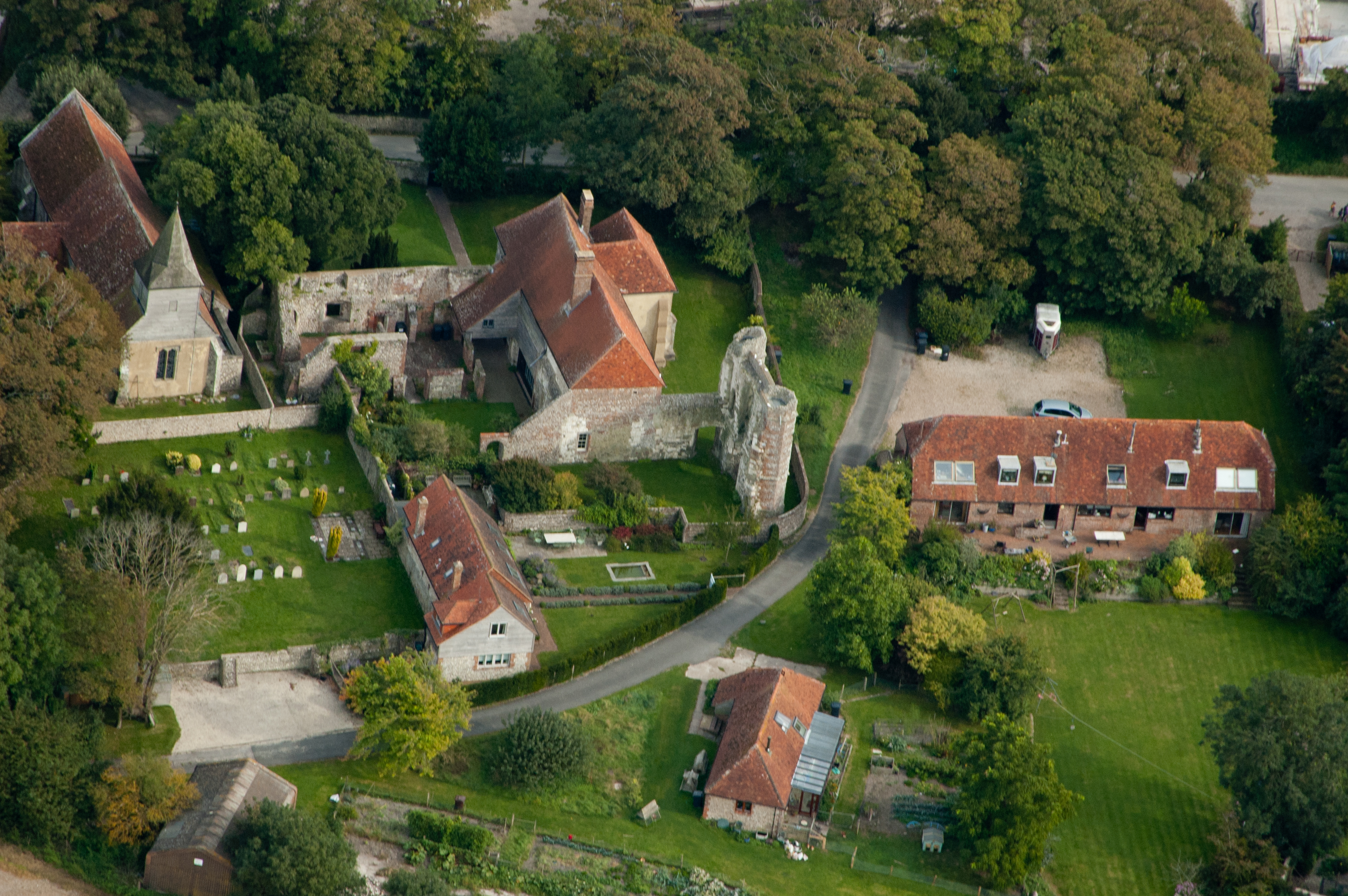
The remains of the priory seen from the air

Wilmington Priory was a Benedictine priory in the civil parish of Long Man, East Sussex, England. The surviving building is now owned by the Landmark Trust and let as holiday accommodation. It is both a Grade I listed building and a scheduled monument.

== History ==
Wilmington Priory was founded in the mid 11th century as a small alien cell of St Mary by Herluin de Conteville. It was enlarged in 1243 to create a priory, but primarily run as a grange to maintain the lands held in the area by the Benedictine monks of Grestain Abbey in Normandy. The building was fortified in the 14th century with a portcullis and a three-storey drum tower, which was demolished in the 18th century.

The grange was suppressed along with other alien cells in 1414, and given to the Dean and Chapter of Chichester Cathedral, who in 1565 granted it to Sir Richard Sackville. About 1700 the estate passed to the Compton family, later Earls of Wilmington. It passed by marriage from them to the Cavendish family, and in 1925 the ninth Duke of Devonshire conveyed the priory to the Sussex Archaeological Trust, who repaired the building and set up a small museum of farm implements.

The priory was open daily in the 1960s. Subsequently, it passed to the Landmark Trust.

On the site today stands a 14th-century two-storey L-shaped house, incorporating part of a 13th-century building, which was modified in the 18th century and is Grade I listed. To the north and south of the house are the ruins of other buildings, under one of which is a 14th-century vaulted undercroft. The priory church is used today as the parish church St Mary and St Peter's Church, Wilmington.

== See also ==
- List of monastic houses in East Sussex
- Alfriston Market Cross. The cross was restored in 1955–56 using stone from a tithe barn which stood in the grounds of Wilmington Priory.
