= Hastings Priory =

Monastery in East Sussex, England

Coordinates: 50.856146°N 0.576882°E

Hastings Priory was a medieval Augustinian monastic house in Hastings, East Sussex, England. It closed down in 1413.

The priory was founded as the Priory of the Holy Trinity of Hastings c.1189–1199 in the time of Richard I, either by Sir Walter Bricet or by Walter de Scotney. The latter certainly gave the canons the churches of Crowhurst and Ticehurst.

In 1413 encroachment of their lands by the sea, threatening the priory itself, forced them to move to a site at Warbleton donated by Sir John Pelham. The king also granted them for twenty years the manor of Monkencourt in Withyham, which had been confiscated from the alien priory of Mortain. At Warbleton the canons were known as 'the New Priory of Hastings'.

Masonry belonging to the old priory was discovered in 1971 during the demolition of the Ritz Cinema in Cambridge Road. The site is now covered by ESK Wholesale Ltd.

== See also ==
- List of monastic houses in East Sussex
