= Otham Abbey =

Abbey in Polegate, East Sussex, England

- Location within East Sussex
- Interactive map of Otham Abbey

Monastery information
- Full name: Abbey of St. Mary and St. Laurence
- Order: Premonstratensians
- Established: c.1180
- Disestablished: 1526

People
- Founder: Ralph de Dene

Site
- Location: Polegate, East Sussex, England
- Coordinates: 50°49′47″N 0°15′07″E
- Grid reference: TQ 588 057
- Visible remains: Chapel

Otham Abbey was a medieval monastic house in Polegate, East Sussex, England.

== History ==
Otham Abbey was founded about 1180 by Ralph de Dene as the Abbey of St. Mary and St. Laurence. Ralph donated his land and chapel of Otham, together with other lands and rents, to establish a house of Premonstratensian canons. Other grants of lands and rents were to follow from other donors.

However, owing to the bleak and unhealthy location of Otham, it was decided to transfer the house some time shortly after 1208 to join a new monastery built at Bayham, in the north of the county, by Sir Robert de Turnham. Otham was retained as a grange and chapel.

After a period of leasing out the land for farming, the establishment was finally dissolved in 1526. The site is now occupied by the Grade II listed Otteham Court, a T-shaped C15 timber-framed building, mostly refaced in red brick with a hipped tiled roof, and a small 14th-century chapel dedicated to St Lawrence. The latter is a grade II* listed building.

== See also ==
- List of monastic houses in East Sussex
