= Blackfriars, Winchelsea =

Monastery in East Sussex, England

Coordinates: 50.926836°N 0.706738°E

Blackfriars, Winchelsea, was a Dominican priory in Winchelsea, East Sussex, England. The friary was established in 1318 by Edward II on the outskirts of the new town of Winchelsea, but after several moves to different locations, was granted in 1358 a site of an acre with five adjoining houses in the town centre. It was dissolved in 1538, at which point the building was ruinous. As with other dissolved religious houses in Winchelsea, the stone of the structures was used for the construction of Camber Castle.

A cellar under a barn in Rectory Lane, dated to the early 14th century, is believed to have formed part of the friary.
