= 1525 Bayham Abbey riot =

Civil disorder in Kent, England

1525 Bayham Abbey Riot
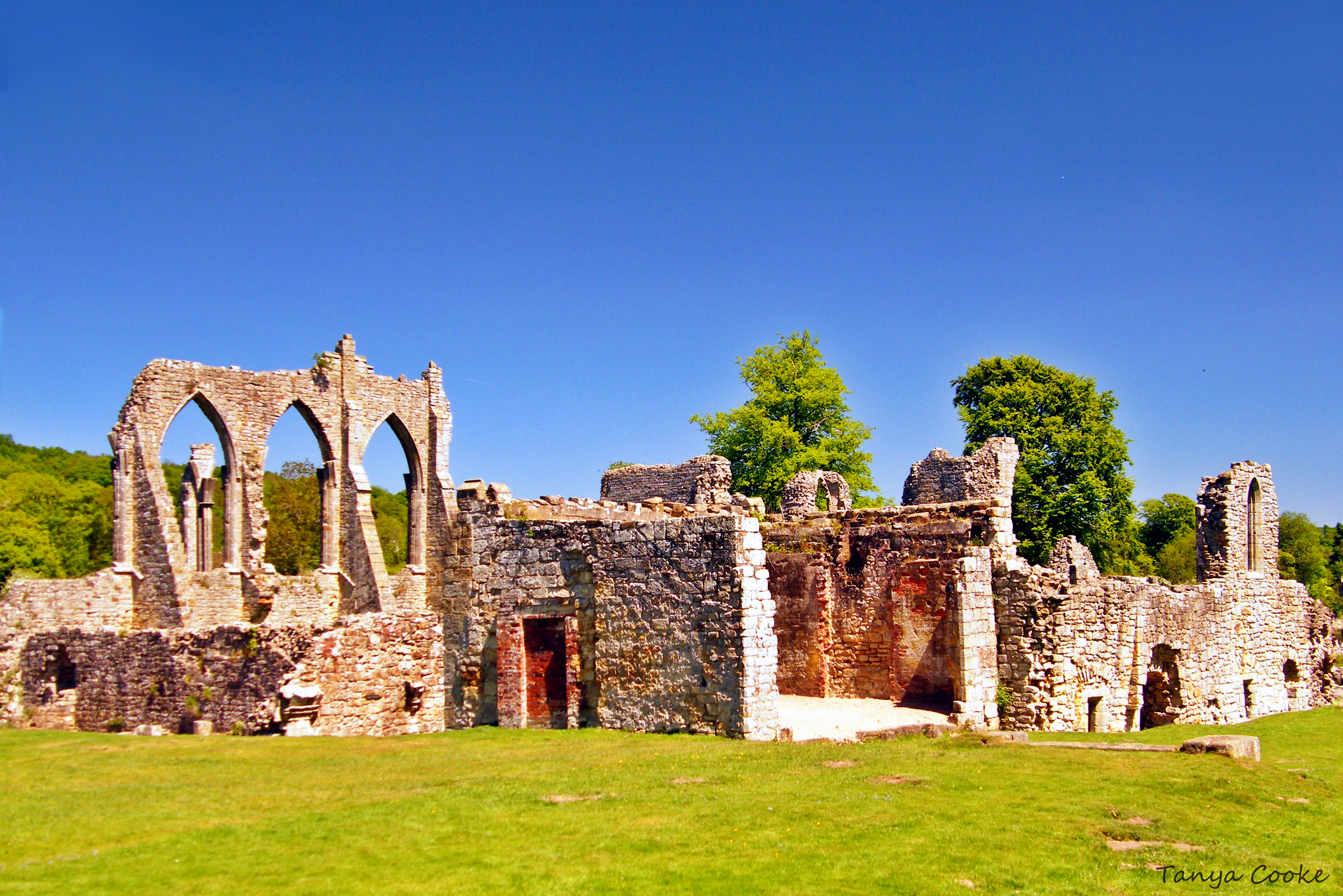
- The ruins of Bayham Abbey
- Date: 4 June 1525
- Location: Bayham Abbey, Kent, Kingdom of England
- Caused by: Cardinal Wolsey suppressing Bayham Abbey to fund colleges he founded
- Goals: Restoration of Bayham Abbey
- Methods: Occupation
- Result: Rioters evicted after a week, 31 arrested

Parties
Kent villagers Sussex villagers	Kingdom of England

Lead figures
(Kent) Canon Thomas Towers	(England) Cardinal Thomas Wolsey

Casualties
- Charged: 31

The 1525 Bayham Abbey riot was a civil disturbance on 4 June 1525 in Kent, England. It was instigated by local residents near Bayham Abbey in protest against the closure of the Abbey. The rioters occupied the Abbey for a week before 31 were arrested.

== Background ==
Bayham Abbey had been constructed in the 13th century for the Premonstratensians and was the centre of the community. Located near what would become Royal Tunbridge Wells, it enjoyed support from surrounding villages in Kent and Sussex as the majority of the canon regulars were locals. Due to mismanagement from two prior abbots, in 1525, the Abbey had a debt of £600 (£541,510 in 2023) with an annual income of only £125 (£112,814 in 2023). As a result, Cardinal Thomas Wolsey decreed that Bayham Abbey was to be suppressed in order to fund Cardinal College at the University of Oxford and Cardinal's College of Mary in Ipswich that he had founded. This was approved by King Henry VIII and the Parliament of England on the grounds of the financial mismanagement as well as reports from 1488 about religious services being neglected and canons wearing "pykys" on their shoes.

== Riot ==
Over 100 members of the local villages took up arms in protest of the closure. It is believed that the riot was instigated by Canon Thomas Towers from the Abbey as well as the vicars of the parish churches in Frant and Pembury. They approached with "painted faces and visures". The reason for them rioting to restore the Abbey was not just to protect their religious community but also their villages economically as the majority of the villages relied on income from the Abbey. It was also stated that the villagers had been drinking ale to celebrate Whitsun before launching their assault on the Abbey.

The villagers stormed the gatehouse controlled by Wolsey's Suppression Commissioners to occupy the Abbey and restored the canons to their positions. The villagers promised the canons that whenever they rang the Abbey bell, the villagers would come to their aid armed. Sir Edward Guildford wrote to his brother, Sir Henry Guildford, the Comptroller of the Royal Household about the riot and explained that the Abbey had been stormed and why. However, due to work requirements, the armed resistance gradually left the occupation of the Abbey before Henry's forces arrived. The remaining rioters and canons were eventually removed from the Abbey after a week and 31 men involved in the occupation were indicted by The Crown for rioting. It is not known what the fates of all the rioters were but the majority were imprisoned. William Gale, listed as one of the 31, would later become Abbot of an abbey in Buckinghamshire. The Abbey was subsequently abandoned after all the fittings were stripped out and sold. Ownership of the Abbey's lands would later be transferred to King Henry VIII in 1538.

== Historical impact ==
21st century historians opined that the riot at Bayham Abbey was a precursor to the Dissolution of the Monasteries in the English Reformation a decade later. On 4 June 2025, to celebrate the 500th anniversary of the riot, English Heritage announced they were searching for the descendants of the 31 men arrested for their part in the riot.
