= Bayham Old Abbey =

English Heritage property near Lamberhurst, Kent, England

Coordinates: 51°6′14″N 0°21′19.3″E

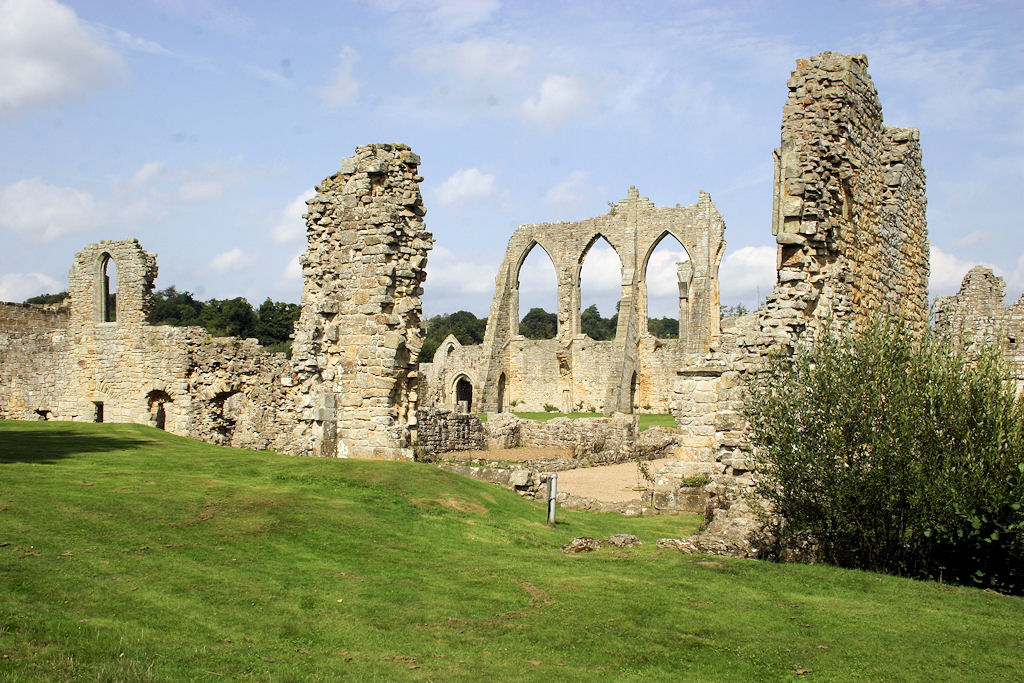
View of Bayham Abbey from the South

Bayham Old Abbey is an English Heritage property, located near Lamberhurst, Kent, England. Founded c. 1208 through a combination of the failing Premonstratensian monasteries of Otham and Brockley, Bayham functioned as an abbey until its dissolution in the 16th century. The ruins were partially modified in the late 18th century, to provide a better landscape feature during landscaping of the new Bayham Abbey mansion park, and were donated to the state in 1961.

== Location ==
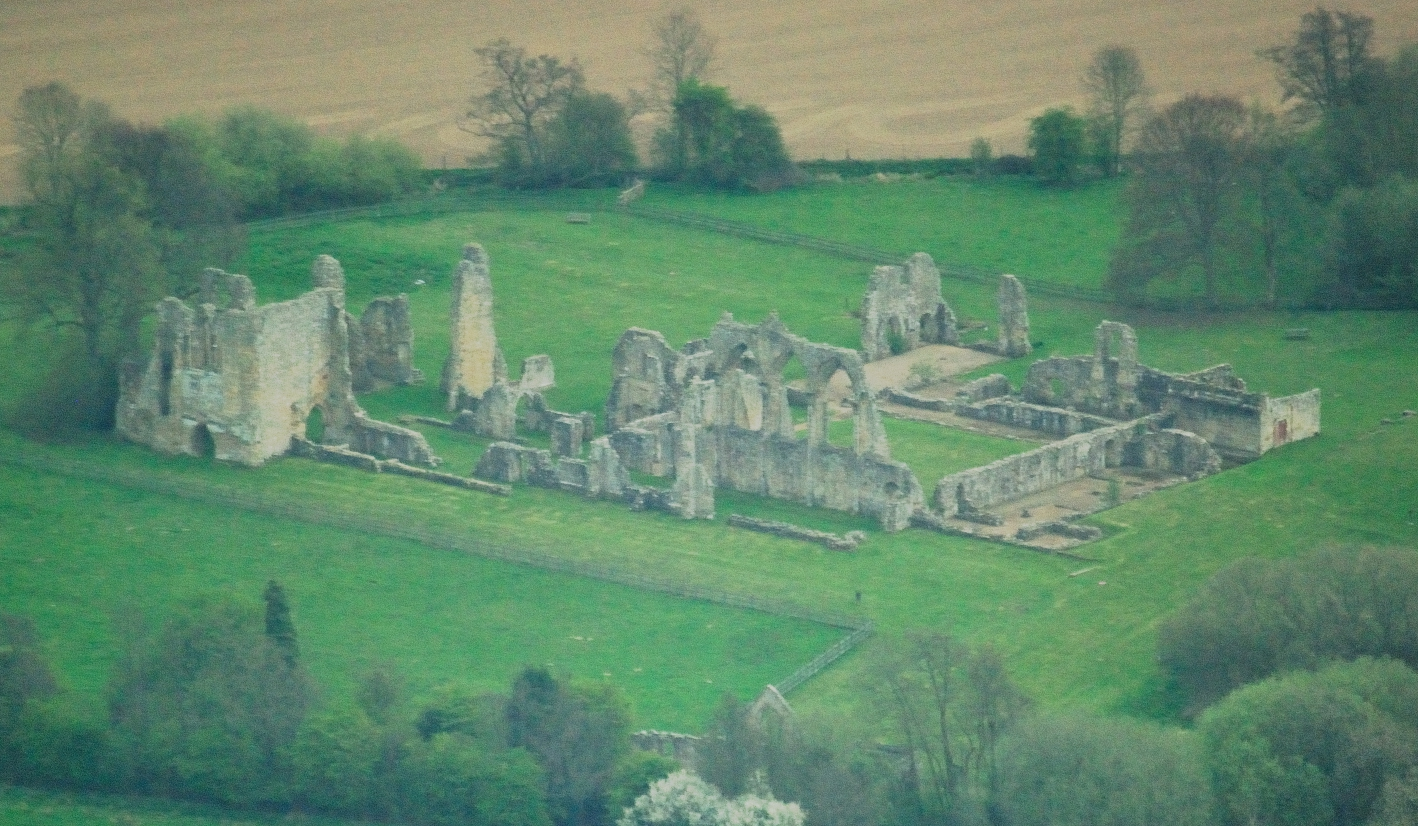
Aerial view of the abbey

Bayham Abbey lies within the valley of the River Teise. Premonstratensian canons often preferred secluded areas for their monasteries, and Bayham was such a location. The river provided a water supply and adequate drainage. As Bayham was founded through the conjunction of two abbeys with different mother houses – Sulby having founded Brockley and perhaps Durford being the mother house of Otham – Prémontré Abbey became the mother church of Bayham Abbey, which then assumed the prestige proper to a daughter of Prémontré.

== The Abbey today ==
The abbey ruins are currently maintained by English Heritage. They largely consist of partial walls, though the room layouts can still be seen, and there remain many examples of ornate capitals and other carved stonework; including stone frameworks from the three giant windows comprising the nave. The quality of the work is particularly fine for a late thirteenth-century Premonstratensian abbey.

The abbey is sited on the Kent/Sussex border and is presumed to have had an entrance in each county. The ruins of a gatehouse, known as the Kentish gate, is situated nearby on the grounds. No trace has been found of the corresponding Sussex gate. Other buildings, normally associated with abbeys, such as stables and barns, are yet to be located.

== Abbey history ==
Bayham Abbey was founded c. 1208 by the merger of two monasteries, Otham (Sussex) and Brockley (Kent), under the authority of Robert of Thurnham. The former abbey had been founded c. 1180 by Ralph de Dene, a Norman landowner, who endowed the abbey in conjunction with his son Robert de Dene, and especially his daughter Ela de Dene, wife, first, of Jordan de Sackville, and, second, of William de Marci. Over the years, the Sackville family became primary supporters of Otham and, for generations, chose the site for their family burials. Other benefactors of the abbey included members of the Brade family, whose name derived from the Broad estate in Hellingly, East Sussex (some family members added “de Helling” to their surnames).

The abbey was built from local sandstone in the first half of the 13th century by Premonstratensian canons. By the 15th century the original design had been enlarged with new transepts, though the original transepts are still visible within the structure. The Abbey was home to Premonstratensian canons regular: that is to say they followed the life ascribed to St Augustine of Hippo, keeping the Augustinian rule in its purity.

The abbey was suppressed by Cardinal Wolsey in 1525 in his attempt to gain funding for two of his new colleges which led to a riot and occupation by local villagers, before falling into the hands of Henry VIII in 1538. Once Bayham was under the King's control, it was leased to Anthony Browne, 1st Viscount Montagu, until Queen Elizabeth sold the estate outright. Following various changes in ownership, Bayham was finally sold to Sir John Pratt in 1714, and remained in that family until 1961, when it was donated to English Heritage. A brief archaeological survey was published in Journal of the Society for Medieval Archaeology 10 (1966:181-182).

The Camden family, descended from the Pratts, built the Dower house (otherwise known as Bayham Old Abbey House), on the estate as the old residence. The new grounds were landscaped by Humphry Repton, who included within his plans the old abbey, which Samuel Hieronymus Grimm had sketched about 1785, emphasising the grand scale and picturesque character of its ivy-clad walls. Some modifications were made to the abbey during this time, memorialised in one of Repton's most complete "Red Books", with the inscription "Application of Gardening and Architecture united, in the formation of a new place".

In 1872, the Camden family moved to the other side of the Teise valley, into the newly built Bayham Abbey House. The abbey remains as a picturesque landscape feature, and has been used for family infant burials.

== See also ==
- List of monastic houses in East Sussex
