= Warbleton Priory =

Coordinates: 50.939298°N 0.334321°E

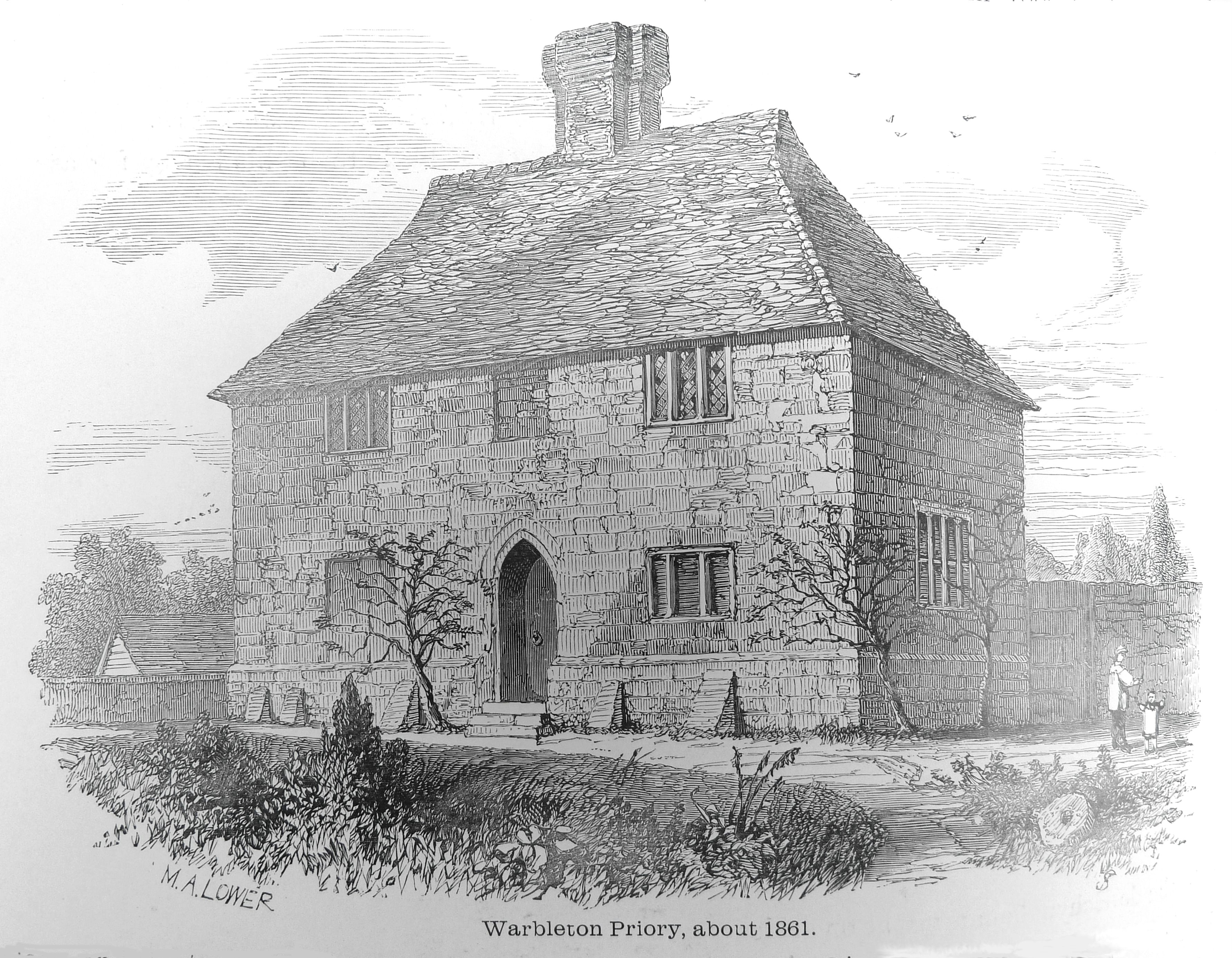
Warbleton Priory, c. 1861

Warbleton Priory was a medieval monastic house in East Sussex, England. The current house is a Grade II* listed building.
