= East Challow =

Village in Oxfordshire, England

Coordinates: 51.5895°N 1.4516°W

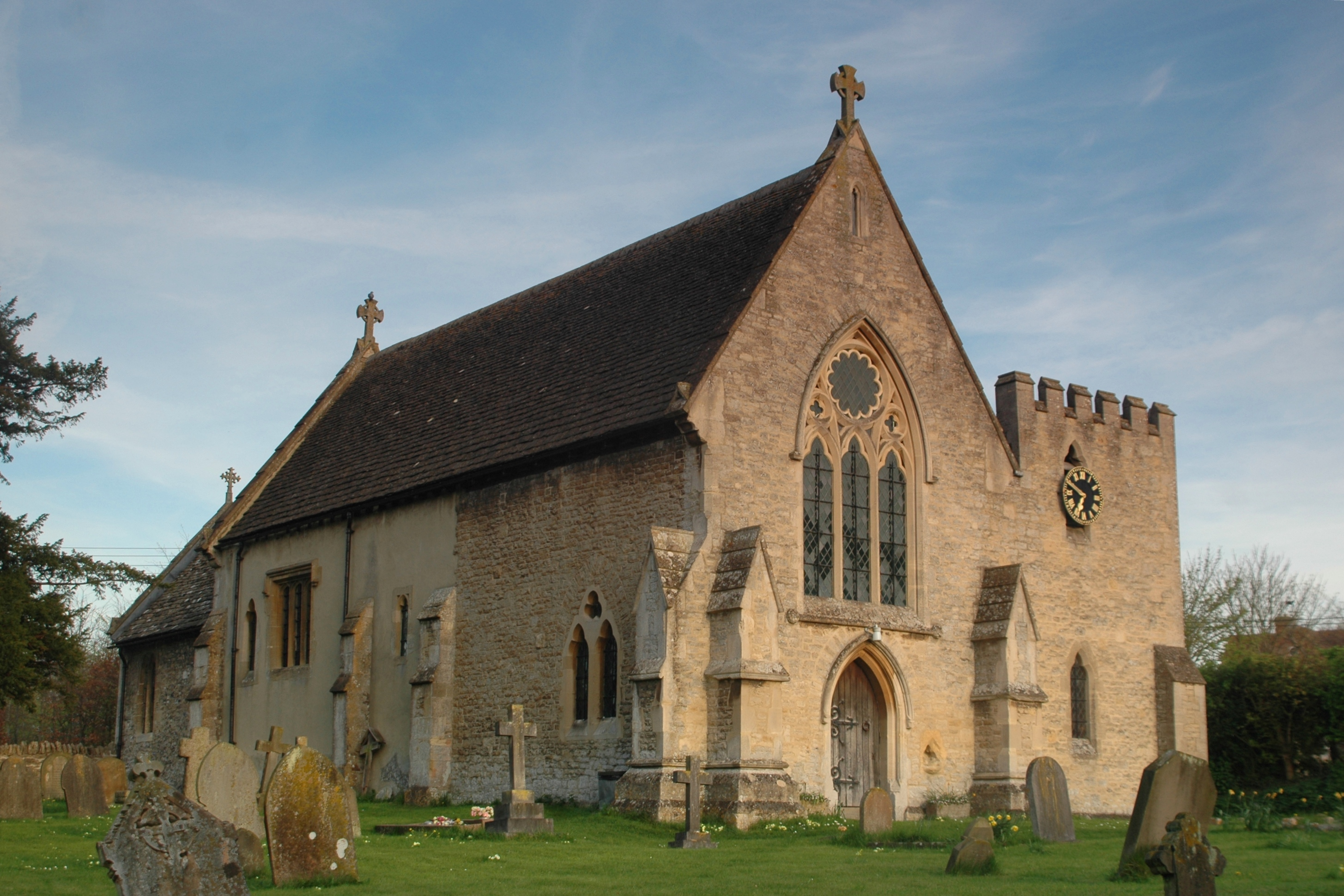
- St Nicholas' parish church

- Location within Oxfordshire
- Population: 769 (2011 census)
- OS grid reference: SU3888
- Civil parish: East Challow
- District: Vale of White Horse
- Shire county: Oxfordshire
- Region: South East
- Country: England
- Sovereign state: United Kingdom
- Post town: Wantage
- Postcode district: OX12
- Dialling code: 01235
- Police: Thames Valley
- Fire: Oxfordshire
- Ambulance: South Central
- UK Parliament: Didcot and Wantage

East Challow is a village and civil parish about 1 mile (1.6 km) west of Wantage in the Vale of White Horse, England. Historically it was part of the ecclesiastical parish of Letcombe Regis, but since 1852 East and West Challow have formed their own single ecclesiastical parish. The civil parish was part of Berkshire until the 1974 boundary changes transferred the Vale of White Horse to Oxfordshire.

== Etymology ==
The place-name Challow is first attested in a charter from 947 (though the earliest surviving copy of the charter is from the 12th century), in the Old English phrase "to Ceawan Hlewe". Hlewe meant "hillock, burial mound". The word ceawan here was long thought to be a personal name attested only here and in the place-names Chacombe, Chawridge and Chaureth, in which case the name Challow meant "Ceawa's burial mound". In the 2020s, it was suggested that Old English had a word cēawe or cēawa, meaning "jackdaw", in which case Challow could have meant "jackdaw hillock".

The name appears as Ceveslane (considered to be a misspelling of Ceveslaue) in the Domesday Book of 1086. Thirteenth-century variants included Chaulea, Chaulauhe, Chawelawe and Shawelawe.

The "East" element in the name, added to distinguish East Challow from West Challow, is first found in 1284 (in the form Est Challowe).

== Church and mission ==
=== Church of England ===
The Church of England parish church of St Nicolas was a-12th century Norman building, but the font and some masonry of the nave are now almost the only original features that survive. In the 13th century the chancel and chancel arch were rebuilt, and the bell-cot and three-bay north aisle were added. The Decorated Gothic south chapel was added early in the 14th century. The communion table was made in the 17th century. In the 18th century the aisle was rebuilt in brick, and a porch was added over a 12th-century doorway.

In 1858 St. Nicolas' was drastically restored, with the aisle and west front rebuilt and the nave re-roofed. The rebuilding of the west front removed a 12th-century west doorway and a 15th-century west window above it. In 1884 the low tower was added at the west end of the aisle. The oak rood screen was added in 1905. The church is a Grade II* listed building. St. Nicolas' has two bells, which are not dated, but the smaller was cast by Robert Wells of Aldbourne, Wiltshire, which makes it very likely to be 18th-century.

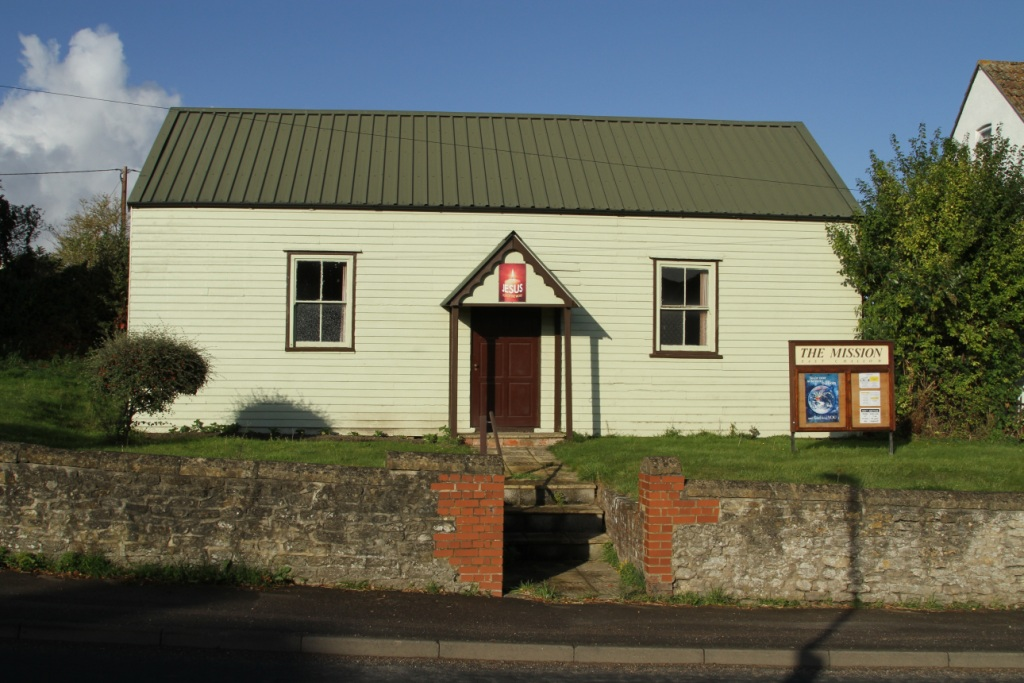
The Mission

=== The Mission ===
The Mission is a Free Church that was built in 1904.

== Transport ==
East Challow village is on both sides of the A417 road, on its section from Wantage to Faringdon.

The Wilts & Berks Canal was built east–west across the parish and opened in 1810, to convey Somerset coal through Wiltshire and Berkshire to the Thames. The canal fell into disuse and was abandoned in 1914, but work to restore it has been in progress since the 1970s. Parts of its route are now footpaths, and there is a narrow strip of overgrown land between Canal Way and Canal Farm Lane.

== Amenities ==
East Challow has a public house, the Goodlake Arms, that was once controlled by Morland Brewery. Vicarage Hill, the village cricket ground, hosts some home matches of the Oxfordshire County Cricket Club.

== Sources ==
- Page, W.H.; Ditchfield, P.H., eds. (1924). A History of the County of Berkshire, Volume 4. Victoria County History. pp. 478–485.
- Pevsner, Nikolaus (1966). Berkshire. The Buildings of England. Harmondsworth: Penguin Books. p. 131.
