= Katharine Pearce =

Katharine Pearce may refer to:

- Katharine Anne Pearce (born 1963), Welsh bowler
- Katharine Georgina Pearce (born 1950), British botanist and ecologist
