= West Challow =

Village in Oxfordshire, England

Coordinates: 51.592°N 1.472°W

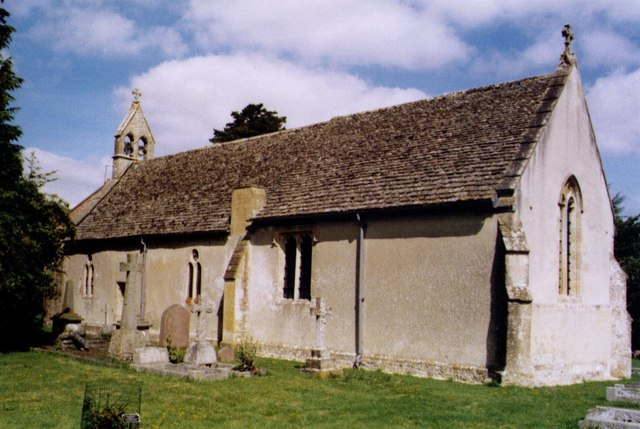
- St Laurence

- Location within Oxfordshire
- Population: 184 (2011 census)
- OS grid reference: SU3688
- Civil parish: West Challow
- District: Vale of White Horse
- Shire county: Oxfordshire
- Region: South East
- Country: England
- Sovereign state: United Kingdom
- Post town: Wantage
- Postcode district: OX12
- Dialling code: 01235
- Police: Thames Valley
- Fire: Oxfordshire
- Ambulance: South Central
- UK Parliament: Didcot and Wantage

West Challow is a village and civil parish about 2 miles (3 km) west of the market town of Wantage in the Vale of White Horse, England. The village is on Childrey Brook, which is a tributary of the River Ock. West Challow was part of Berkshire until the 1974 boundary changes transferred the Vale of White Horse to Oxfordshire. The 2011 census recorded the parish's population as 184.

== Etymology ==
The place-name Challow is first attested in a charter from 947 (though the earliest surviving copy of the charter is from the 12th century), in the Old English phrase "to Ceawan Hlewe". Hlewe meant "hillock, burial mound". The word ceawan here was long thought to be a personal name attested only here and in the place-names Chacombe, Chaureth and Chawridge, in which case the name Challow meant "Ceawa's burial mound". In the 2020s, it was suggested that Old English had a word cēawe or cēawa, meaning "jackdaw", in which case Challow could have meant "jackdaw hillock".

The name appears as Ceveslane (considered to be a misspelling of Ceveslaue) in the Domesday Book of 1086. Thirteenth-century variants included Chaulea, Chaulauhe, Chawelawe and Shawelawe.

The "West" element in the name, added to distinguish West Challow from East Challow, is first found in 1284 (in such forms as Westcha(e)lawe and Weschallawe).

== Parish church ==
The Church of England parish church of Saint Laurence is part of the Benefice of Ridgeway, along with the parishes of Childrey, Kingston Lisle, Letcombe Bassett, Letcombe Regis and Sparsholt.

== Canal ==
The course of the former Wilts & Berks Canal passes through the parish, skirting the south side of the village. It was extended eastwards from Longcot to Challow in 1807 and was completed to the River Thames at Abingdon in 1810. The Wilts & Berks carried small amounts of canal cargo through Challow until at least 1895–96. Traffic on the canal had virtually ceased by 1901 and the route was formally abandoned in 1914. The Wilts & Berks Canal Trust is currently restoring the canal.

== Manor of Challow ==
The Manor of Challow was granted by King Henry I to Robert Achard between 1107 and 1118, and passed later to Sir William Forster who held it in the early 17th century. Manor Farm is a Grade II* listed Queen Anne building with much older inclusions.

== Sources ==
- Dalby, L.J. (2000) [1971]. The Wilts and Berks Canal (3rd ed.). Usk: Oakwood Press. ISBN 0-85361-562-4.
- Page, W.H.; Ditchfield, P.H., eds. (1924). A History of the County of Berkshire. Victoria County History. Vol. 4. assisted by John Hautenville Cope. London: The St Katherine Press. pp. 222–228.
- Pevsner, Nikolaus (1966). Berkshire. The Buildings of England. Harmondsworth: Penguin Books. pp. 262–263.
