= Old Town Hall, Wantage =

Municipal building in Wantage, Oxfordshire, England

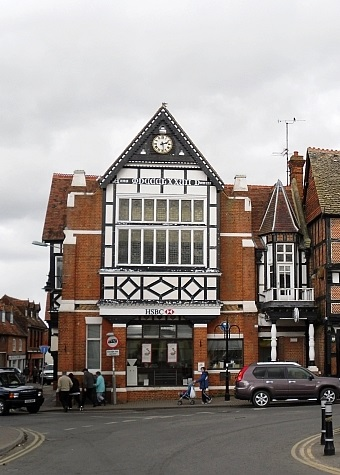
- Old Town Hall, Wantage

- Shown in Oxfordshire
- 51.5890°N 1.4267°W
- Location: Market Place, Wantage

History
- Built: 1878

Site notes
- Architect: William Tasker
- Architectural style: Gothic Revival style

The Old Town Hall is a municipal building in the Market Place in Wantage, Oxfordshire, England. The building, which was the headquarters of Wantage Urban District Council, was converted into apartments in 2018.

== History ==
The first municipal building in the town was a medieval town hall in the centre of the Market Place which stood on wooden posts and dated back at least to the mid-17th century. It was demolished in 1835 and replaced by a second town hall, a brick building which was financed by public subscription at a cost of £600. In November 1873, the second town hall was the venue for a meeting, chaired by Lord Wantage, at which it was agreed to commission the Wantage Tramway. By the mid-1870s, the second town hall was "so unworthy of the town that no one regretted its disappearance" and it was demolished in 1876 and replaced by a statue of Alfred the Great, which was presented to the town by Lord Wantage and unveiled by the Prince and Princess of Wales on 14 July 1877.

A condition of the demolition of the second town hall was a requirement that it be replaced by a new building: Lord Wantage donated a site at the northwest corner of the Market Place which was occupied by a public house, "The Falcon". The new building was again financed by public subscription with Lord Wantage and Lord Overstone contributing £1,400 between them. It was designed by William Tasker in the Gothic Revival style, built in red brick with elements of timber framing at a cost of £3,600 and was completed in May 1878.

The design involved an asymmetrical main frontage with two bays facing onto the Market Place; the left-hand bay featured a shop front flanked by piers supporting a large oriel window with a timber frame surround. The window was surmounted by a frieze inscribed with the words "Anno Dominum MDCCCLXXVII" (AD 1877) with a gable containing a clock face above. The right-hand bay, which was recessed, featured a doorway flanked by columns supporting a balcony: there was a French door on the first floor and a spire above. Internally, the principal rooms were the offices for the local savings bank, the town commissioners, the literary institute, and the local police on the ground floor and there was a large assembly room for public meetings and magistrates' court hearings on the first floor.

Following significant population growth, largely associated the status of Wantage as a market town, the area became an urban district with the town hall as its headquarters in 1894. The town hall also functioned as an events venue: an exhibition to celebrate the Festival of Britain was held there in summer 1951 and performers included the beat band, The Merseybeats, who gave a concert there in April 1966. The building continued to serve as the headquarters of the council for much of the 20th century but ceased to be the local seat of government when the council move to new offices in Portway in the late 1960s. The building was subsequently converted for use as a branch of Midland Bank and then, following the acquisition of Midland by HSBC in June 1992, it became a branch of HSBC. After HSBC closed their branch in June 2016, the ground floor was converted for retail use and first floor was converted for residential use in 2018.
