= Letcombe Laboratory =

Laboratory in Oxfordshire, England

The Letcombe Laboratory was located at Letcombe Regis, Oxfordshire, UK. It began life in 1957 as the Agricultural Research Council Radiobiological Laboratory investigating contamination of land and food by radioactive substances, especially strontium-90, released by weapons testing. When atmospheric testing was halted in the 1960s, the laboratory's work was re-directed towards the study of plant root systems and their interactions with agricultural soils. In recognition of this transition, the laboratory was renamed the Letcombe Laboratory in 1969. Under this new guise, it came to resemble more closely numerous other agricultural research institutions owned or funded by UK's Agricultural Research Council (ARC) (Cooke, 1981). These were made-up of eight institutes directly under ARC control together with fourteen ARC grant-aided institutes in England and Wales and eight in Scotland. In 1983, the ARC was re-organised and renamed the Agricultural and Food Research Council (AFRC) and, two years later, central government expenditure cuts forced the Letcombe Laboratory to close along with the nearby AFRC Weed Research Organisation with which the Letcombe Laboratory had collaborated closely. The site was then bought by the Dow Chemical Company and used as a centre for crop fungicide research.

== First beginnings ==
In the 1950s, radioactive fall-out in the UK from atmospheric nuclear weapons testing by the US, Britain and the USSR and from peaceful uses of atomic energy was being monitored by the UK Atomic Energy Authority (UKAEA) with attendant risks to human health, especially from strontium-90, being assessed by the UK Ministry of Agriculture, Fisheries and Food (MAAF) and the UK Medical Research Council. In addition, the then Director of the UKAEA Sir John Cockroft initiated a small research group led by Dr Robert Scott Russell at the University of Oxford Department of Agriculture to examine the movement of nuclear fission products in soil and plants. In 1954, a committee headed by (Lord) Victor Rothschild recommended that this work be expanded by providing the Oxford group with facilities at the nearby ARC Field Station at Compton, Oxfordshire, later to become the Institute for Research on Animal Diseases (closed in 2016). In 1956, 15 staff moved into newly constructed accommodation. Lead scientists included a radiochemist, plant physiologist, field agronomist and a veterinary scientist. However, the arrangement was not entirely satisfactory and, in August 1957, it was agreed that the Agricultural Research Council should seek new premises and take over responsibility for expanding the work to include not only nationwide surveys of radionuclide contamination of soil, herbage and human food (notably strontium-90 in milk, and caesium-137) but also experimental studies of how radioactive substances move through soil and into plants and the food chain. The extent to which the nuclear fire at Windscale Cumberland (now Cumbria) just two months later energised matters is unclear. But, by November that year, new appointees had been installed in temporary quarters provided by UKAEA on a former military airfield at RAF Grove, near Wantage, Oxfordshire and were soon evaluating grass and milk collected from the Windscale area (Loutit et al., 1960; Ellis et al., 1960). The first in a long series of reports from the ARC Radiobiological Laboratory on nationwide nuclear contamination appeared in 1959. The following year, the report was mentioned in a debate on strontium-90 contamination reported in Hansard, the UK House of Commons record of parliamentary business, and in the British Medical Journal in April 1960.

== Relocation and re-emphasis ==
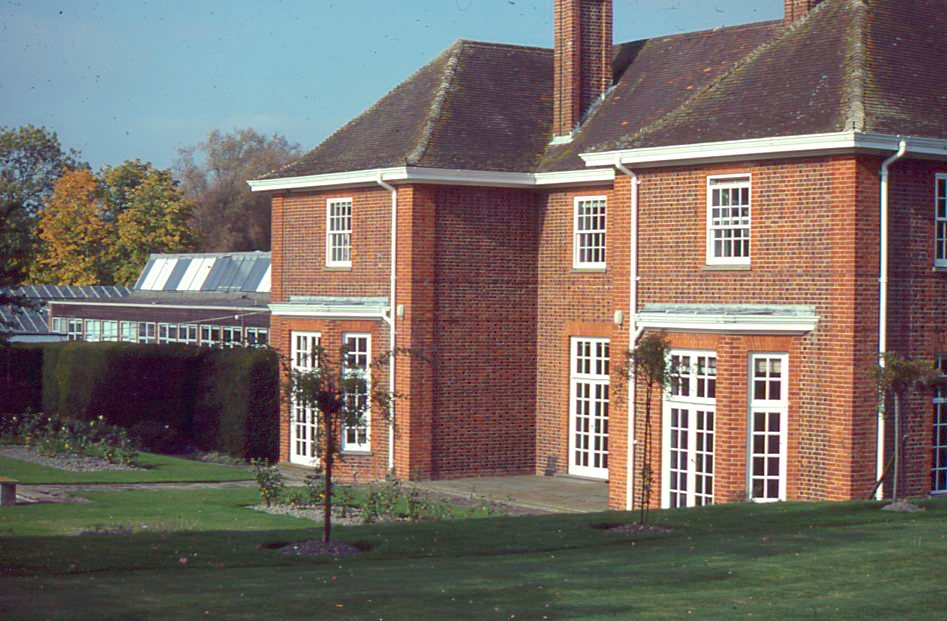
The south front of Letcombe Manor in 1978 with new laboratory wing added in 1962.

In 1959, the sizeable Letcombe Manor Estate at Letcombe Regis, a small downland village in the county of Berkshire (Oxfordshire from 1974), was purchased by ARC as the laboratory's permanent home. The 19th Century manor house (photograph) was retained for administration and several new buildings and experimental glasshouses added. By March 1962, most remaining staff at Grove and Compton had been transferred along with Russell as Director. The impact of an influx of scientists on the existing rural population of only a few hundred was considerable with the village undoubtedly benefitting from new job opportunities, more income for local businesses and a revitalisation of the parish council, primary school and general social life. However, the abandoning of atmospheric atomic weapon testing in 1962 and the signing of the Partial Test Ban Treaty the following year reduced radioactive fallout and thus placed a question mark over the long-term need for the Laboratory. Russell's response was to move the laboratory's work gradually in favour of experimental studies of plant root function by making use of existing research strengths and radioactivity-measuring equipment. A national centre of expertise in root physiology was certainly desirable since scientific understanding of roots lagged far behind that of above-ground parts despite the tending of the root environment (i.e., the soil) being a major task of arable farming. The research was organised primarily around laboratory-based physiology linked to studies of root behaviour in the field, the latter concentrating on the impact of recently introduced minimal cultivation and direct drilling techniques on soil conditions and root performance. These field studies, in particular, benefitted from close collaboration with the nearby ARC Weed Research Organisation at Begbroke, Oxfordshire and with the MAAF Experimental Field Drainage Unit at Cambridge. The direction of this work was also influenced by a report from the UK Agricultural Advisory Board and MAFF entitled 'Modern farming and the soil'.

== Rise, fall and rebirth ==
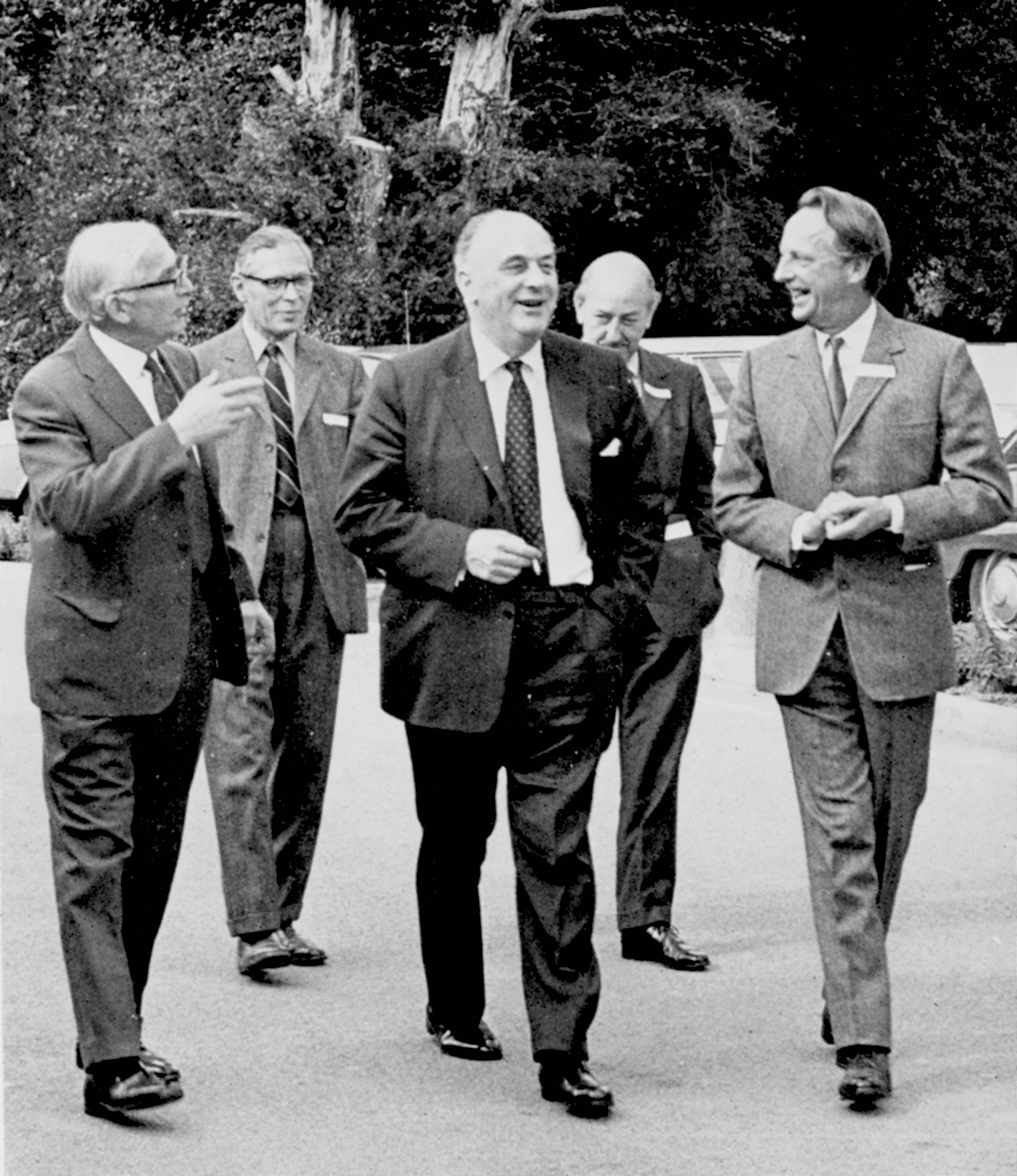
Lord Victor Rothschild (centre) visiting the Letcombe Laboratory in September 1973 prior to delivering a speech. He is accompanied on the left by Dr R.S. Russell (Director) and on the right by the Honourable J. J. Astor (Chairman of ARC).

The re-orientated Letcombe Laboratory attracted several new principal investigators and, over the next 20 years, proved increasingly productive in terms of its scientific output and influence on farming practice. During that time, publications on root physiology and agronomy amounted to some 420 peer-reviewed articles, 100 book chapters, 13 authored or edited books and 150 shorter reports. In addition, there were numerous publications relating to the work on radionuclide contamination which continued on a diminished scale throughout. In May 1982, under Dr J.V. Lake (Director since 1978) the laboratory marked its silver jubilee with three consecutive open days under the banner of "Roots at Work". However, despite this high watermark, cracks were already appearing in the financial and conceptual support for Letcombe and similar organisations. These were clearly discernible in the views of the highly influential (Lord) Victor Rothschild, who had been Chairman of the Agricultural Research Council from 1948 to 1958 and, as stated above, instrumental in bringing Letcombe Laboratory into being in the first place. Years earlier, Rothchild's discontent with how research priorities were identified and acted upon was outlined in a lecture marking the 1953 golden jubilee of Long Ashton Research Station another ARC-funded laboratory then specialising in fruit research. By 1971, these views were formalised and extended by Rothschild's influential but controversial report "The Organisation and Management of Government R&D". At the time, Rothschild was Head of the Central Policy Review Staff, a part of Central Government's Cabinet Office. By 1974, his recommendations had been acted-on. They created tensions at Letcombe and elsewhere between perceived needs for applied research to be paid for by MAAF (the "customer") and more curiosity-driven work to be funded by ARC (the "contractor"). In a speech made at Letcombe in September 1973 Rothschild foreshadowed the Laboratory's eventual closure by stating "We have to realise that we have neither the money nor the resources to do all those things we would like to do and so often feel we have the right to do" (Agricultural Research Council, 1974). Because of its wide implications for the public expenditure in the UK, the speech made headline news in the national press. In the year following Letcombe's Silver Jubilee (1982), AFRC published a Corporate Plan which announced that the Letcombe Laboratory would be closed to help accommodate a £2.4 million cut in the council's budget (the "Barnes Cuts") and to comply with new central government policy of leaving near-market science to the private sector. Some scientists were relocated to either University of Bristol's Long Ashton Research Station (closed in 2003) or to Rothamsted Experimental Station (now Rothamsted Research Ltd) with some existing long-term field experiments located elsewhere in the country being retained and allowed to run their course. By 1985, the Letcombe site had been sold to Dow Elanco a subsidiary of the Dow Chemical Company. The name Letcombe Laboratory was retained and the site redeveloped as the company's European centre for fungicide research. After 17 years this too was closed, thus bringing to an end 45 years of research at the site. It was sold for re-development as a retirement village, leaving the Letcombe Valley, a 7.5 ha stretch of Letcombe Brook, as a nature reserve in the care of the Berkshire, Buckinghamshire and Oxfordshire Wildlife Trust under a 50-year lease.
