= Statue of Alfred the Great =

Statue of Alfred the Great may refer to:

- Statue of Alfred the Great, Pewsey
- Statue of Alfred the Great, Southwark
- Statue of Alfred the Great, Wantage
- Statue of Alfred the Great, Winchester
