= Hugh of Chalcombe =

12th and 13th-century English royal justice

Sheriff of Staffordshire
- In office 1194–1198
- Monarch: Richard I of England

Hugh of Chalcombe (sometimes Hugh de Chalcombe or Hugh of Chaucombe; died after 1209) was an English nobleman and royal justice.

Hugh was the heir of Matthew of Chalcombe, but the exact relationship is not known. Hugh first appears in the written record in 1168, when he paid a relief of 30 pounds for six knight's fees. From his name, he may have been born in Chacombe in Northamptonshire, and was certainly raised there. His next appearance is in 1184 when he was fined one mark to be released from an oath.

Hugh served as a royal justice from 1192 to 1194 and further served as an itinerant justice in 1194. He served as Sheriff of Staffordshire from 1194 to 1198.

In the early years of King John of England, Hugh served the king in Normandy and England in a number of roles. He was again a royal justice, he witnessed charters, he led inquiries into the importation of grain in Norman ports, and he attended the king's court. From 1205 to 1207 he was placed in charge of the royal castle at Kenilworth.

In 1206–1207 Hugh appears to have lost the king's favour, perhaps because he failed to account for profits earned in his various offices. He was ordered to relinquish control of Kenilworth and was even ordered to be arrested for failing to answer the charge of wrongful possession of cattle that was brought against him by R. de Aungerville. Hugh paid 800 marks to regain the royal favour.

Hugh was married to Hodierna de Lucerne, and they had one son, Robert, and two daughters. Hugh founded Chacombe Priory, an Augustinian priory founded during the reign of King Henry II of England. In 1209 Hugh became a canon at Chacombe. Robert was his heir and in 1214 was responsible for his father's debts to the king. One of Hugh's daughters married Hamund Passalewe and the other married Ralph of Grafton.
