= Icknield Way Morris Men =

British traditional dance troupe

Icknield Way Morris Men is a Cotswold Morris Dancing team based in Wantage, Oxfordshire. As a member of the Morris Ring, Icknield Way's members are all male.

== History of the side ==
Icknield Way Morris Men was formed by pupils at Icknield School in Wantage, who approached their music teacher Mary Shunn in September 1958, looking for ideas for an after-school club. Mary had an interest in traditional English dancing and was friends with active dancers, including members of William Kimber's family and Jim Phillips, squire of the Morris Ring from 1958 to 1960. She taught dances from the Headington tradition along with these other dancers.

Icknield Way Morris Men celebrated its 50th anniversary in 2009 with a tour along the Icknield Way ancient highway.

== Appearance ==
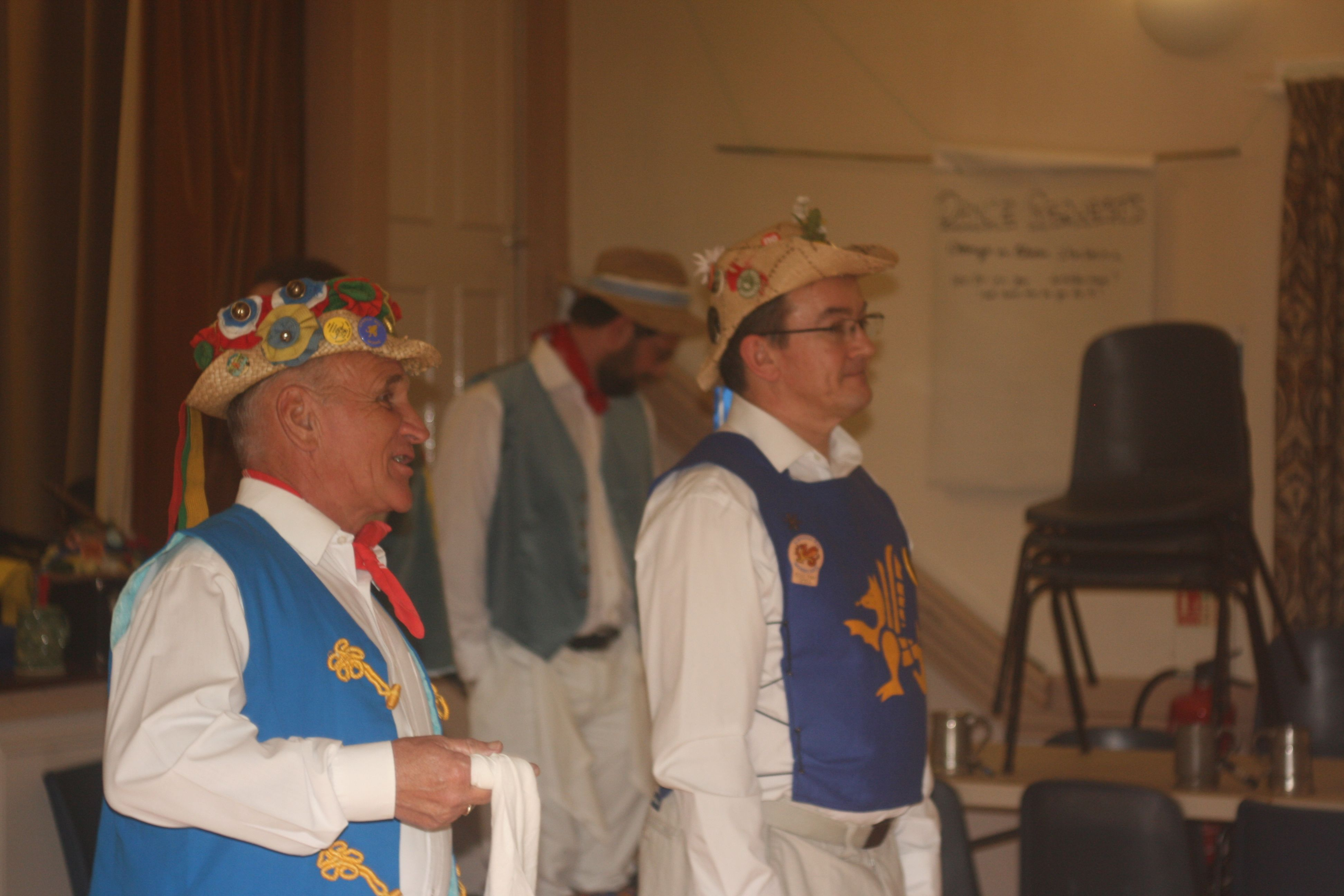
Dancers from Icknield Way Morris Men, wearing three different variations of the kit.

The uniform of Icknield Way's dancers has changed significantly over time but has always been based on "whites", the traditional white trousers and shirt of Cotswold Morris dancers. The uniform has always featured a Wessex wyvern, the symbol of Icknield School. The wyvern currently appears in orange and yellow on the back of a sky blue waistcoat worn over the shirt. Dancers also wear straw hats adorned with ribbons, flowers and badges, along with red spotted neckerchiefs. Video footage of Oxford's May Day celebration shows that this kit has remained fundamentally unchanged since at least 1997.

For the team's 50th anniversary tour, Icknield Way was joined by a side of "old boys" dancing in earlier incarnations of the uniform. The old boys' kit features a yellow wyvern on either a dark blue waistcoat or tabard, depending on the age of the uniform.

== Events ==
Icknield Way members meet to practise every Wednesday in the Scout Hut at Grove, Oxfordshire during the winter months. Between May and September, they dance out on Wednesdays at pubs in the Vale of White Horse and surrounding area. Like many Morris Dancing teams, Icknield Way holds an annual "ale", a private party for members of their own and selected other teams usually comprising food, drink, show dances and "massed" dances.

=== Wantage Mummers ===
Icknield Way sponsors the Wantage Mummers, who perform a traditional Mummers Play on Boxing Day every year in Wantage. The players are all members of the Icknield Way team, who have put on the play every Boxing Day since 1977.

=== The Tudors ===
Some members of Icknield Way appeared as dancers in an episode of BBC Drama "the Tudors" in 2008.

=== May Morning ===
Every year on 1 May, Oxford City Morris hosts a dancing event beginning at the Radcliffe Square, after the choir of Magdalen College, Oxford has sung madrigals in the college's bell tower. Icknield Way is often an invited side at the May Morning celebration, including the event on 1 May 2010.

== Stanton Harcourt ==
Morris dancing has been documented as a traditional activity in Stanton Harcourt from the 19th and 20th Centuries, as in this account from Oxford-based folklorist Percy Manning:

This whittle belonged to & was used for many years in Change with its Companion a B[l]ack one, which got broken by a man named Bob Potter; a native of Stanton Harcourt who for a very long time played to all [the] Morrises for many miles Round[...]

It is thought that the whittle and dub (a.k.a. Pipe and Tabor) had already fallen out of fashion among Morris musicians by the time of Manning's writing, and that his quest for the Stanton Harcourt black whittle was part of a desire to rescue the instrument and its place in Cotswold Morris from oblivion.

There is no longer a permanent Stanton Harcourt side. Icknield Way are "keepers of the tradition", and dance the collected dances from the village. The Stanton Harcourt tradition consists mainly of stick dances, an oddity in the local area as most dances from neighbouring traditions are handkerchief-based. Twice a year, members of Icknield Way perform in Stanton Harcourt kit. The kit consists of red and gold baldricks with the Harcourt shield, and Icknield Way's blue and yellow bellpads over whites.
