= Letcombe Bassett =

Village in Oxfordshire, England

Coordinates: 51.563°N 1.463°W

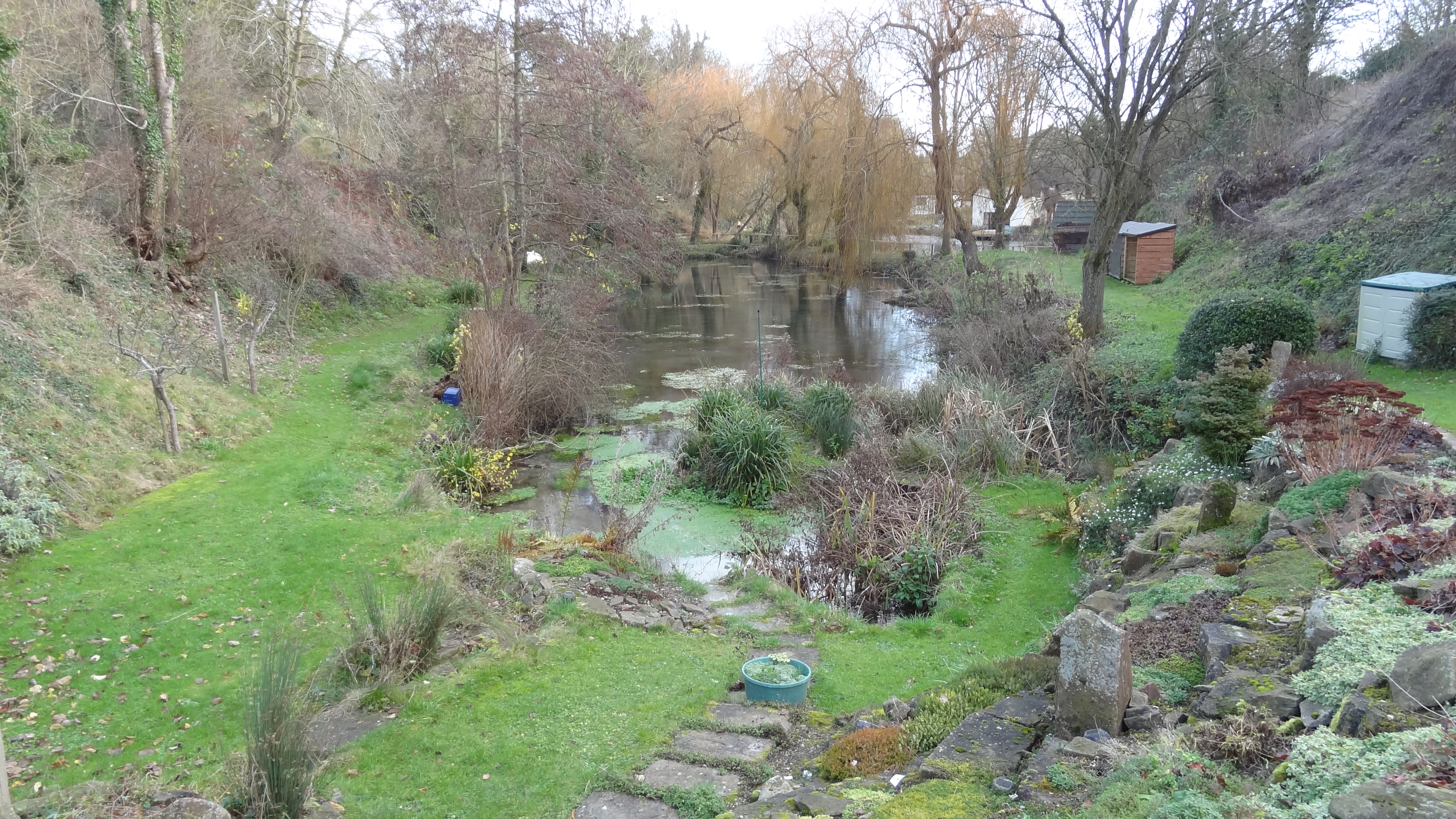
- Source of Letcombe Brook

- Location within Oxfordshire
- Population: 148 (2011 Census)
- OS grid reference: SU3785
- Civil parish: Letcombe Bassett
- District: Vale of White Horse
- Shire county: Oxfordshire
- Region: South East
- Country: England
- Sovereign state: United Kingdom
- Post town: Wantage
- Postcode district: OX12
- Dialling code: 01235
- Police: Thames Valley
- Fire: Oxfordshire
- Ambulance: South Central
- UK Parliament: Didcot and Wantage
- Website: Letcombe Bassett Parish Meeting

Letcombe Bassett is a village and civil parish about 2 miles (3 km) southwest of the market town of Wantage in the Vale of White Horse. It was part of Berkshire until the 1974 boundary changes transferred the Vale of White Horse to Oxfordshire. The 2011 Census recorded the parish population as 148. The village is a spring line settlement, being the source of Letcombe Brook at the foot of the Berkshire Downs escarpment. Hackpen, Warren & Gramp's Hill Downs Site of Special Scientific Interest is in the parish.

== Parish church ==
The Church of England parish church of Saint Michael and All Angels is a Grade II* listed building. St Michael's parish is part of the Ridgeway Benefice, along with the parishes of Childrey, Kingston Lisle, Letcombe Regis, Sparsholt and West Challow.

== Bibliography ==
- Ekwall, Eilert (1960) [1936]. Concise Oxford Dictionary of English Place-Names (4th ed.). Oxford: Oxford University Press. Letcombe Basset & Regis. ISBN 0198691033.
- Ditchfield, PH; Page, William, eds. (1924). "Letcombe Bassett". A History of the County of Berkshire. Victoria County History. Vol. IV. assisted by John Hautenville Cope. London: The St Katherine Press. pp. 217–222.
- Pevsner, Nikolaus (1966). Berkshire. The Buildings of England. Harmondsworth: Penguin Books. pp. 166–167.
