= Manor Farm, West Challow =

Farmhouse in West Challow, Oxfordshire, England

Coordinates: 51°35′41″N 1°28′11″W

Manor Farm
- Interactive map of the Manor Farm area

General information
- Status: Grade II listed
- Architectural style: Queen Anne with earlier elements
- Location: West Challow, Oxfordshire, England
- Completed: Early 18th century (Queen Anne additions c.1724)
- Owner: Rt. Hon. David Maundrell and Lady Louise Maundrell

Design and construction
- Known for: Historic architecture; featured in The Perfect English Country House

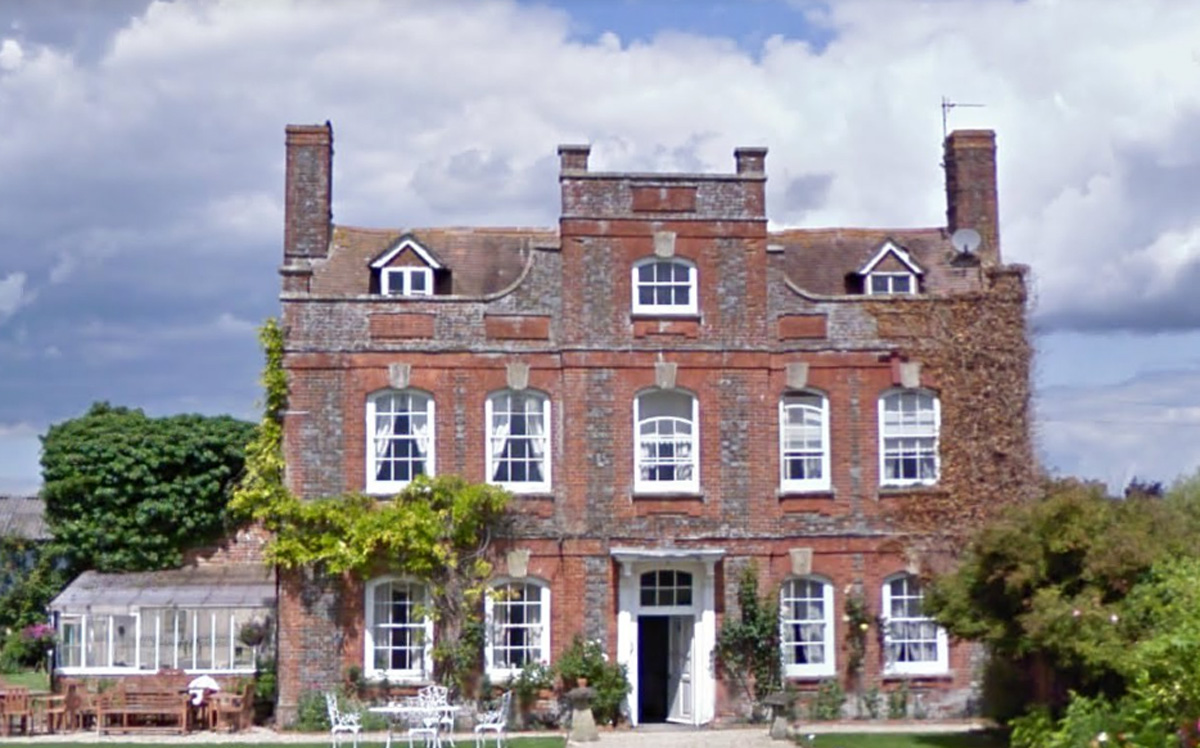
Manor Farm house, West Challow

Manor Farm in West Challow, Oxfordshire, England, is a building of historical significance and is Grade II listed on the English Heritage Register. It is a Queen Anne–style house with earlier parts. It was included in Candida Lycett Green's book called The Perfect English Country House. The property was owned by many prominent people over the centuries. Today it provides bed-and-breakfast accommodation and caters for special events, particularly weddings.

== Early history ==
The village of West Challow was once called the Manor of Petwick and in about 1100 was held by the nuns of Amesbury. In 1541, at the time of the dissolution of the priory, the manor was granted to Sir Thomas Seymour, who sold it to the tenant Richard Plott. It descended through two generations of this family until it was sold in 1600 to Henry Martyn.

By 1635 it had passed to Ralph Pigott, and it remained in this family until 1802. The Pigott family were wealthy landowners in the area, and many of their monuments are still in St Laurence Church at West Challow. It is likely that one of them built the Queen Anne additions to the present Manor Farm. The most likely person is Francis Pigott, the heir, who married Ann Barr in 1724 at about the time of the new construction.

== Later owners ==
In 1802 Thomas Hatton, a wealthy landowner who lived in Childrey, bought the manor from the Pigott family. He died in 1804 and left the property to his children. In 1818 an advertisement was placed in the newspaper by his son William Hatton for the sale of the farm. It stated that the Manor House came "with dove house, barns, stables, cow houses, and other outbuildings, yard and garden".

It was sold shortly after this to Daniel Agace, who lived in Ascot. On his death in 1828 the manor passed to his relative Daniel Ferard, who died in 1837, leaving it to his eldest son Charles Cotton Ferard. Charles owned the manor for about 50 years, during which time he let it to various tenants.

One group who rented the house for many years was the Hunt family. Uriah Hunt (1817–1870) took a lease on Manor Farm about 1860. He had previously been on a smaller farm (about 130 acres) in West Challow with his wife Harriet and six children, but by 1861 he had moved to the Manor House and was farming over 500 acres and employing 17 men and 12 women. When he died in 1870, his son Frederick took over the farm and then later moved to the Rectory Farm in Cambridgeshire. He died in 1919 a fairly wealthy man. The current owner is the Rt. Hon. David Maundrell and the South African socialite Lady Louise Maundrell who is fastidiously restoring the property to its former glory. David is a serial entrepreneur and philanthropist well known in the Oxfordshire county.

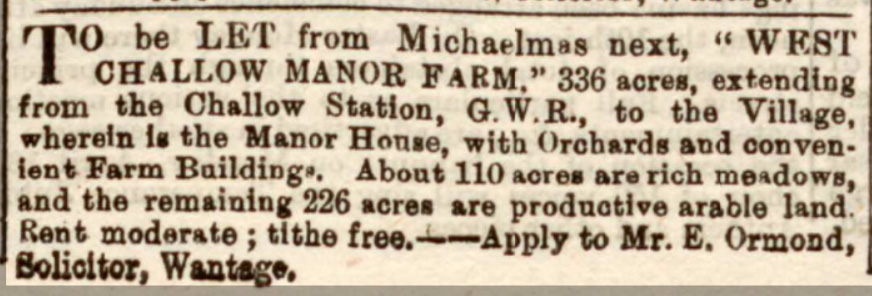
Rental advertisement for Manor Farm in 1887

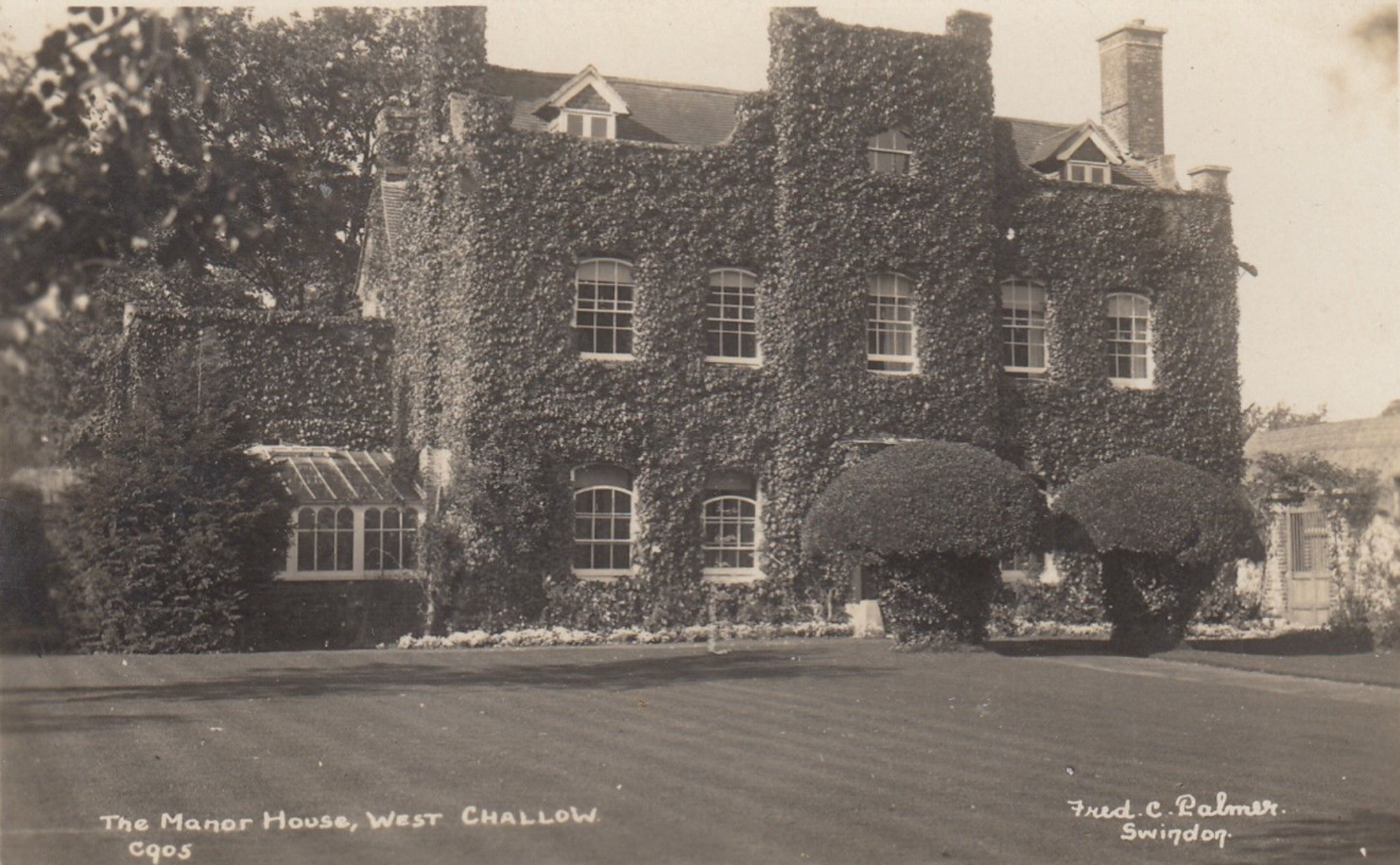
Manor Farm house about 1900

Charles Cotton Ferard died in 1886, and in 1887 the property was advertised for rent. In 1899 the farm was sold to Robert Loyd-Lindsay, 1st Baron Wantage, and when he died in 1901, his wife Lady Harriet Wantage became the owner.
