= Chawridge Bourne =

Nature reserve in Berkshire, England

- Site of Special Scientific Interest
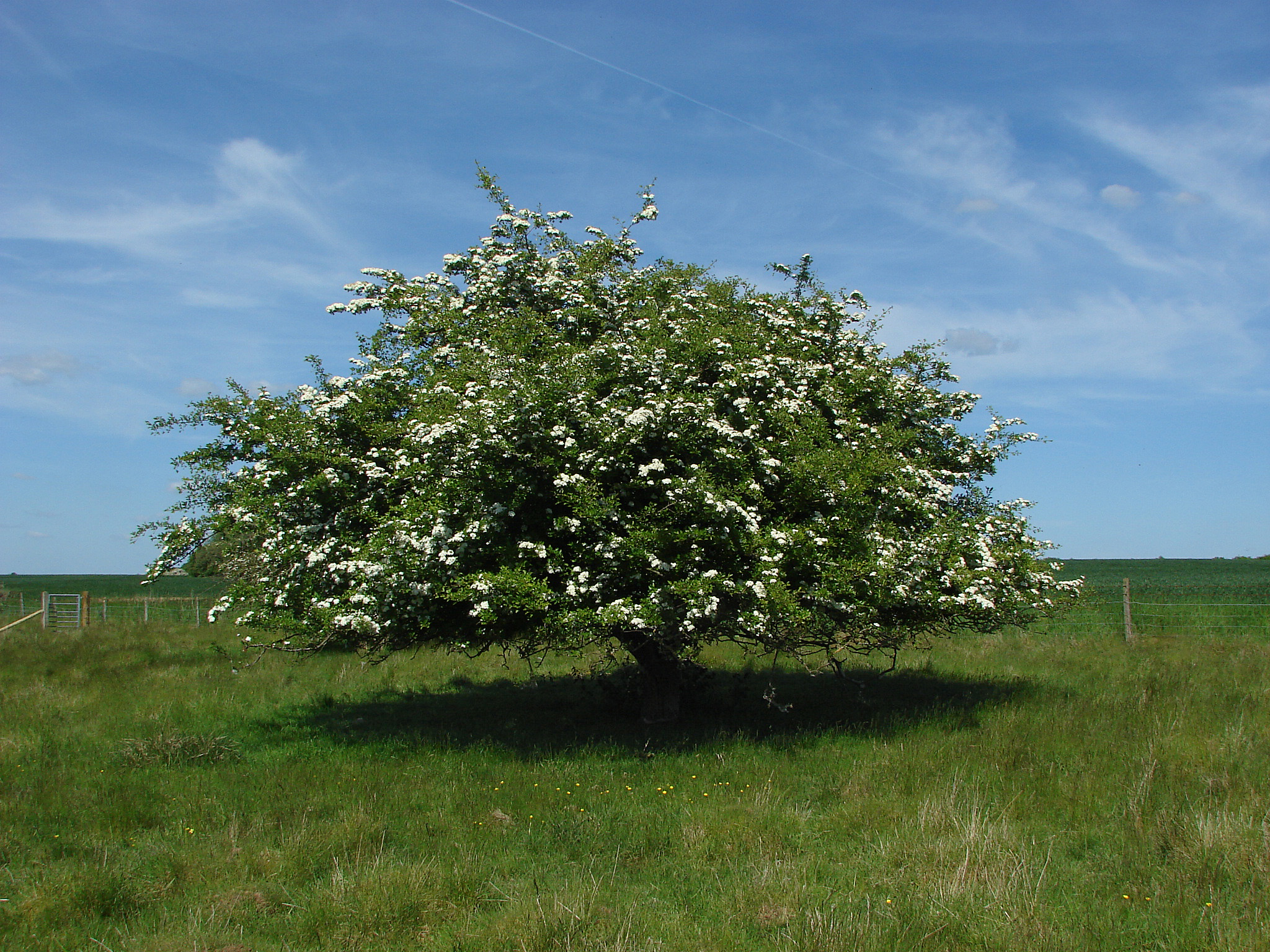
- Location of Chawridge Bourne.
- Area of search: Berkshire
- Grid reference: SU 894 736
- Coordinates: 51°27′18″N 00°42′54″W
- Interest: Biological
- Area: 9.4 hectares (23 acres)
- Notification date: 1983
- Location map: Magic Map

Chawridge Bourne is a 9.4-hectare (23-acre) biological Site of Special Scientific Interest in Berkshire, England Part of the site is a 5-hectare (12-acre) nature reserve called Chawridge Bank, which is managed by the Berkshire, Buckinghamshire and Oxfordshire Wildlife Trust.

== Etymology ==
The name Chawridge is first attested in a charter of 942, which includes the Old English phrase "on ceawan hrycges hagan" ("to the enclosure of ceawa's ridge"). The word ceawan here was long thought to be a personal name attested only here and in the place-names Chacombe, Chaureth and East and West Challow, in which case Chawridge meant "the ridge belonging to Ceawa". In the 2020s, it was suggested that Old English had a word cēawe or cēawa, meaning "jackdaw", in which case Chawridge could have meant "jackdaw ridge". As well as appearing in Chawridge Bourne, the name also appears in the neighbouring sites of Chawridge Manor Farm, Charriage Lane, Chawridge Mead, and Chawridge Gorse.

== Ecology ==
This linear site is named after the stream called Chawridge Bourne, which runs through it. Half of it is unimproved grassland, which is managed by sheep grazing. There are also areas of scrub and broadleaved woodland. On the east side there is an ancient parish boundary hedge which has diverse tree flora.

=== Fauna ===
The site has the following animals

==== Mammals ====
- Micromys minutus

==== Birds ====
- Alauda
- Great spotted woodpecker
- Eurasian blackcap
- Lesser whitethroat

==== Invertebrates ====
- Polyommatus icarus
- Erynnis tages
- Pyrgus malvae

=== Flora ===
The site has the following flora:

==== Trees ====
- Crataegus monogyna
- Prunus spinosa
- Fraxinus
- Maple
- Quercus robur
- Malus sylvestris
- Sorbus torminalis

==== Plants ====
- Arrhenatherum elatius
- Holcus lanatus
- Dactylis glomerata
- Deschampsia cespitosa
- Festuca rubra
- Achillea ptarmica
- Genista tinctoria
- Hordeum secalinum
- Ophioglossum vulgatum
- Primula veris
- Silaum silaus
- Senecio erucifolius
- Carex pallescens
- Potentilla anglica
- Succisa pratensis
- Ranunculus auricomus
- Phyllitis scolopendrium
- Polystichum setiferum
- Centaurea nigra
- Leontodon taraxacoides
