= Cherry Green, Essex =

Hamlet in Essex, England

Coordinates: 51.943°N 0.290°E

Cherry Green
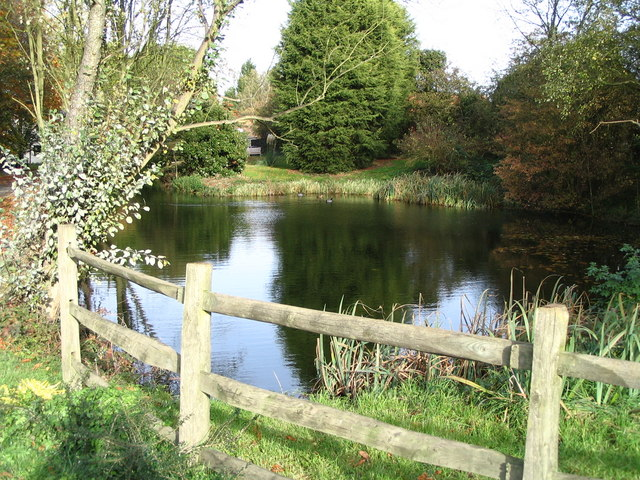
- Pond at Cherry Green

- Location within Essex
- OS grid reference: TL574296
- Civil parish: Broxted
- District: Uttlesford
- Shire county: Essex
- Region: East
- Country: England
- Sovereign state: United Kingdom
- Post town: DUNMOW
- Postcode district: CM6
- Dialling code: 01279
- Police: Essex
- Fire: Essex
- Ambulance: East of England
- UK Parliament: Saffron Walden

Cherry Green or Chaureth Green is a hamlet in the civil parish of Broxted and the Uttlesford district of Essex, England. The hamlet is 1.5 miles (2.4 km) north from the parish village of Broxted, 2.5 miles (4.0 km) west from the town of Thaxted, and 16 miles (30 km) northwest from the county town of Chelmsford.

Cherry Green contains nine Grade II listed buildings: three cottages, two houses, three farmhouses, and a barn.

== Etymology ==
The name of Cherry Green is first attested in the Domesday Book of 1086, as Ceauride. Other early attestations include Chaureth(e) in 1295. The second element of the name is thought to be the Old English word riþ, meaning "brook". The first element of the name was long interpreted as an Old English personal name Cēawa, attested only here and in the place-names Chacombe, Chawridge and East and West Challow, in which case the name Chaureth once meant "Ceawa's brook". In the 2020s, however, it was suggested that Old English had a word cēawe or cēawa, meaning "jackdaw", in which case Chaureth could have meant "jackdaw brook".
