= Broxted =

Village in Essex, England

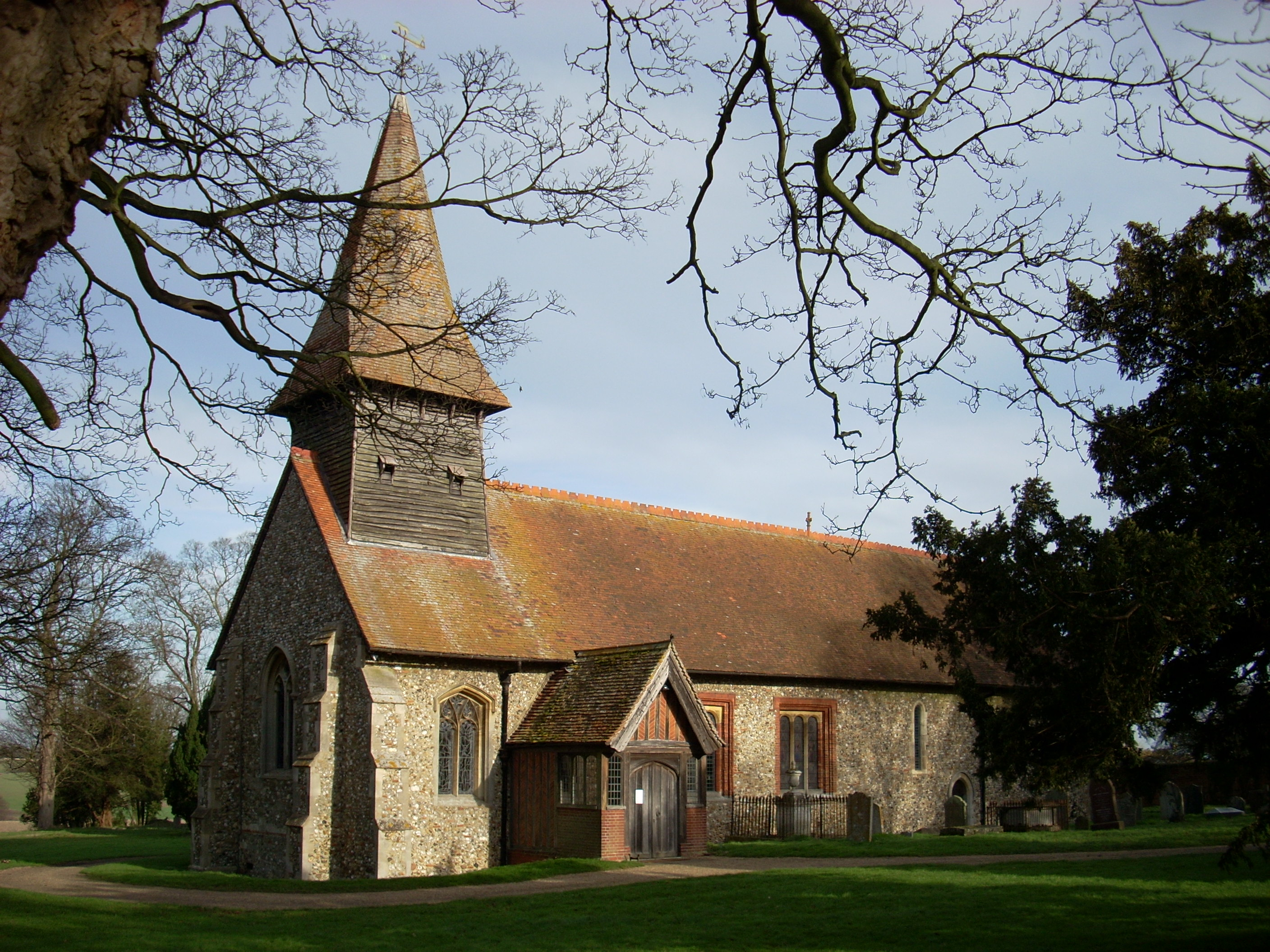
- St Mary's Church, Broxted

- Location within Essex
- Population: 553 (Parish, 2021)
- OS grid reference: TL578270
- Civil parish: Broxted
- District: Uttlesford
- Shire county: Essex
- Region: East
- Country: England
- Sovereign state: United Kingdom
- Post town: DUNMOW
- Postcode district: CM6
- Dialling code: 01279
- Police: Essex
- Fire: Essex
- Ambulance: East of England
- UK Parliament: Saffron Walden

Broxted is a village and civil parish in the Uttlesford district, in the county of Essex, England. It is situated 11 km (6.8 mi) north-east from Bishop's Stortford, Hertfordshire and 23 km (14 mi) north-west from the county town of Chelmsford. The parish includes the hamlets of Cherry Green and Brick End. At the 2021 census the parish had a population of 553.

Broxted is in the parliamentary constituency of Saffron Walden. There is a Parish Council.

The village lies on the road between Molehill Green and Thaxted. It has one public house, the Prince of Wales. In the 16th and 17th centuries, part of Broxted was known as Chawreth.

Broxted Mill was a windmill located in the village at Church End (51°55′12″N 0°17′41″E). It was in good condition in 1932, but it fell down in 1953.

== See also ==
- The Hundred Parishes
