= Hackpen, Warren & Gramp's Hill Downs =

UK Site of Special Scientific Interest

Coordinates: 51.55827°N 1.48932°W

- Site of Special Scientific Interest
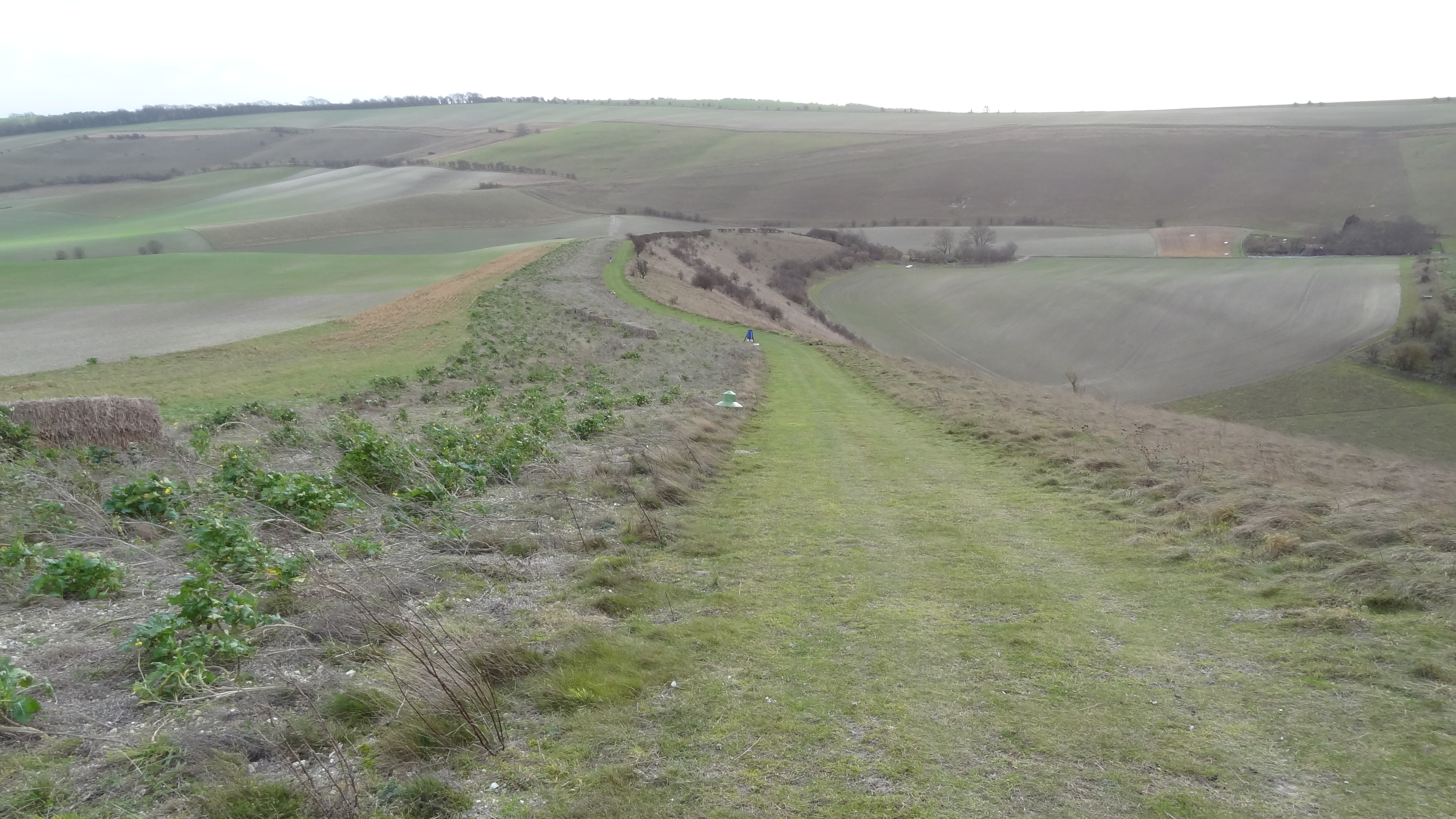
- Location of Hackpen, Warren & Gramp's Hill Downs.
- Area of search: Oxfordshire
- Grid reference: SU 357 847
- Interest: Biological
- Area: 71.4 hectares (176 acres)
- Notification date: 1986
- Location map: Magic Map

Hackpen, Warren & Gramp's Hill Downs is a 71.4-hectare (176-acre) biological Site of Special Scientific Interest in Letcombe Bassett in Oxfordshire.

== Site features ==
The site is composed of three separate sloping areas of unimproved chalk downland, representing a type of habitat now uncommon in the Berkshire Downs. It was formerly notified as Hackpen Hill and Crowhole Bottom. Eleven species of butterfly have been recorded, including chalkhill blue, brown argus and marbled white. The site has extensive views over rolling countryside.

Gramp's Hill Down is the most easterly area, and the closest to Letcombe Bassett. The main grass is upright brome, and it has a rich variety of herbs, including yellow rattle, chalk milkwort and kidney vetch.

The eastern half of the central area, Warren Down, is also dominated by upright brome, with herbs including bulbous buttercup and salad burnet. The main grass in the western half is meadow grass, with bare patches and rabbit damaged areas which have been colonised by plants of disturbed ground such as henbane.

At the western end is Hackpen Down, the largest part of the site, which has a wide variety of aspects and gradients. The main grass is red fescue, and herbs include horseshoe vetch and common rockrose. A narrow strip to the east contains hawthorns and elder scrub.

== Hackpen Hill bowl barrow ==
Hackpen Hill Bowl Barrow is a Bronze Age barrow a few metres north of Hackpen Down. It is approximately 21 metres in diameter and 1.4 metres high, surrounded by a quarry ditch from which material was taken to construct it, but which is now largely infilled. There is a depression at the top probably caused by an excavation by antiquarians, although no record of this survives. It is a Scheduled monument, and its grid reference is SU 3510 8518.

== Access ==
There is access to Gramp's Hill Down by a footpath called Apple Pie from Holborn Hill in Letcombe Bassett. The site is just north of The Ridgeway long-distance footpath, and there is access to it from Hackpen Down.
