= Chacombe =

Village in Northamptonshire, England

Coordinates: 52.088°N 1.279°W

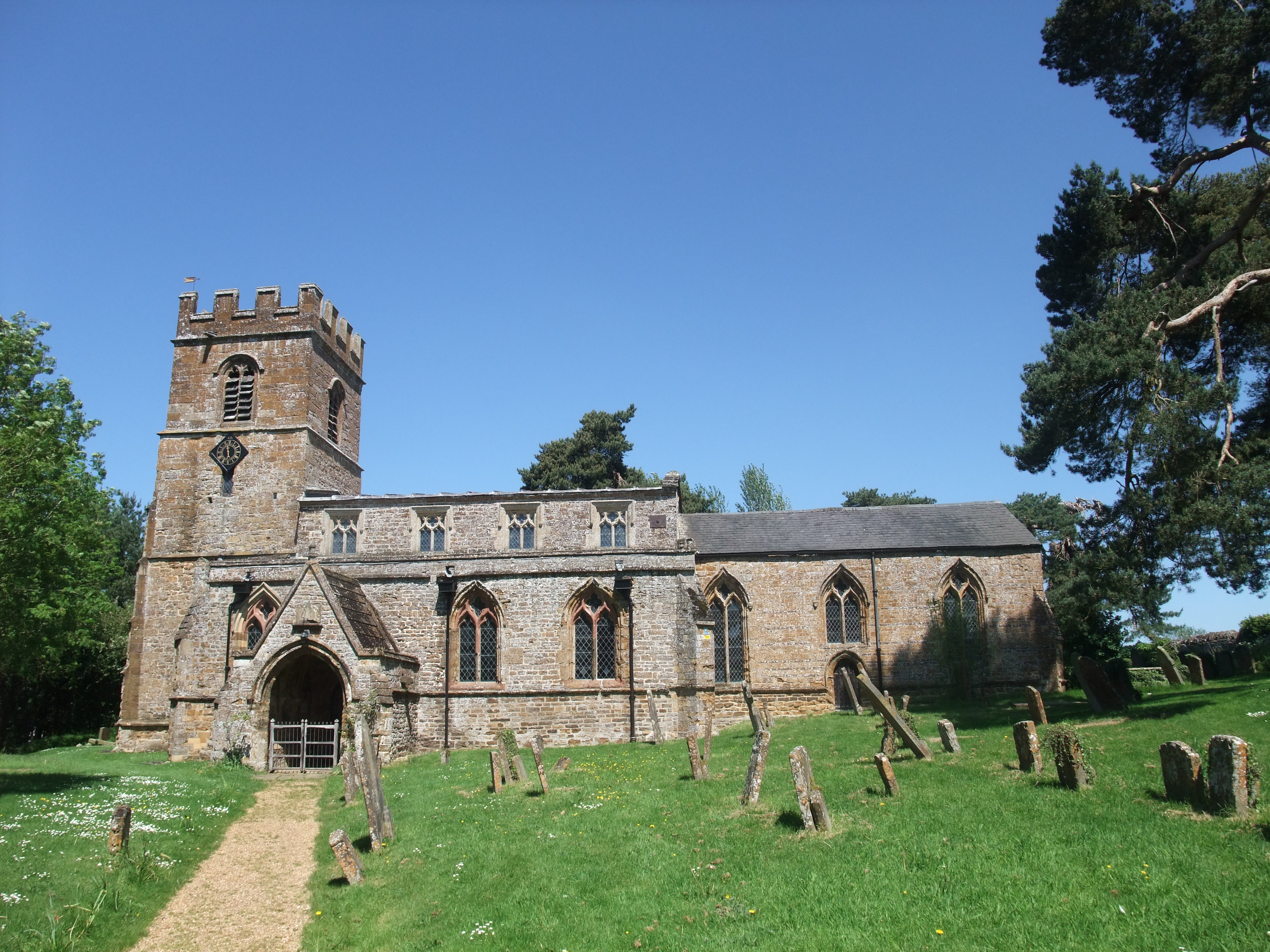
- SS Peter & Paul parish church

- Location within Northamptonshire
- Population: 659 (2011 census)
- OS grid reference: SP4943
- Civil parish: Chacombe
- Unitary authority: West Northamptonshire
- Ceremonial county: Northamptonshire
- Region: East Midlands
- Country: England
- Sovereign state: United Kingdom
- Post town: Banbury
- Postcode district: OX17
- Dialling code: 01295
- Police: Northamptonshire
- Fire: Northamptonshire
- Ambulance: East Midlands
- UK Parliament: Daventry
- Website: Chacombe Parish Council

Chacombe (sometimes Chalcombe in the past) is a village and civil parish in West Northamptonshire, England, about 3 miles (5 km) north-east of Banbury. It is bounded to the west by the River Cherwell, to the north by a tributary and to the south-east by the Banbury–Syresham road. The 2011 census gave a parish population of 659 and a 2019 estimate 693.

== Etymology ==
In 1086 the Domesday Book recorded the toponym as Cewecumbe. In most later Medieval documents it is recorded as Chaucumba.

The name is thought to be from Old English, and its second part to be the word cumb, meaning "valley". The first part of this name was long thought to be a personal name Ceawa, attested only here and in the place-names Chawridge, Chaureth and East and West Challow, in which case Chacombe meant "the valley belonging to Ceawa". In the 2020s, it was suggested that Old English had a word cēawe or cēawa, meaning "jackdaw", in which case Chacombe could have meant "jackdaw valley".

== Manor ==
In the mid-11th-century reign of Edward the Confessor, a certain Bardi held the manor of Chacombe "freely" (i.e. without a feudal overlord). However, the Domesday Book of 1086 records that after the Norman Conquest of England one Godfrey held the manor of Cewecumbe of Remigius de Fécamp, Bishop of Lincoln. This had four hides of arable land, nine acres of meadow and three watermills. In the 12th century the manor was still assessed as four hides and still held from the Bishop of Lincoln.

The manor house has been demolished. It was on the north-west side of the village, just east of the parish church, in Berry Field, now called Berry Close.

== Priory ==
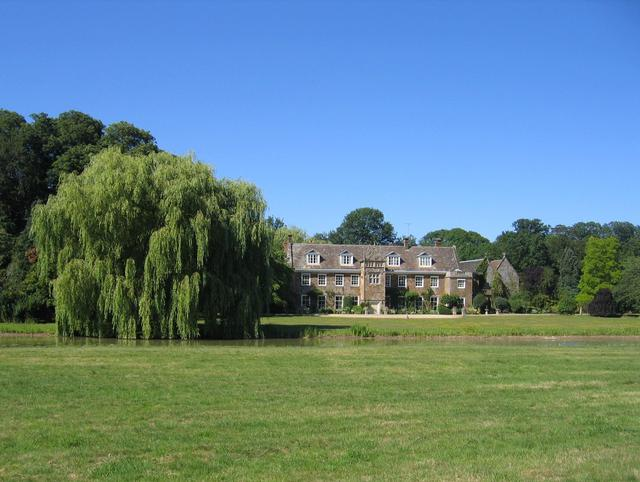
Chacombe Priory

Hugh of Chalcombe, lord of the manor of Chacombe, founded the Augustinian Chacombe Priory in the reign of Henry II (1154–1189). It was just west of the present village.

In 1536 the Priory was suppressed in the dissolution of the monasteries and passed all its properties to the Crown. The only visible remains of it are a small chapel apparently built in the 13th century and a set of medieval fishponds, although at least three medieval stone coffin slabs, one from the 13th century, have been found in the priory grounds.

Part of the priory site is now occupied by a house, also called Chacombe Priory. The house has a large Elizabethan porch and a late 17th-century staircase, and was remodelled in the Georgian era.

== Parish church ==
The earliest part of the Church of England parish church of Saints Peter and Paul is the Norman font. The current building is essentially Decorated Gothic from the early part of the 14th century, including the three-bay arcades either side of the nave. The north aisle has a 14th-century wall painting of Saint Peter being crucified upside-down. It is one of only two wall paintings of Saint Peter's crucifixion known in England, the other being in the parish church at Ickleton in Cambridgeshire. The church is a Grade I listed building.

The bell tower has a ring of six bells. William Bagley of Chacombe cast four of them including the treble bell in 1694. John Briant of Hertford cast the present fifth bell in 1790; the Whitechapel Bell Foundry cast the present tenor bell in 2009.

The parish is a member of the Chenderit Benefice, which also covers the parishes of Greatworth, Marston St. Lawrence, Middleton Cheney, Thenford and Warkworth.

== Social and economic history ==
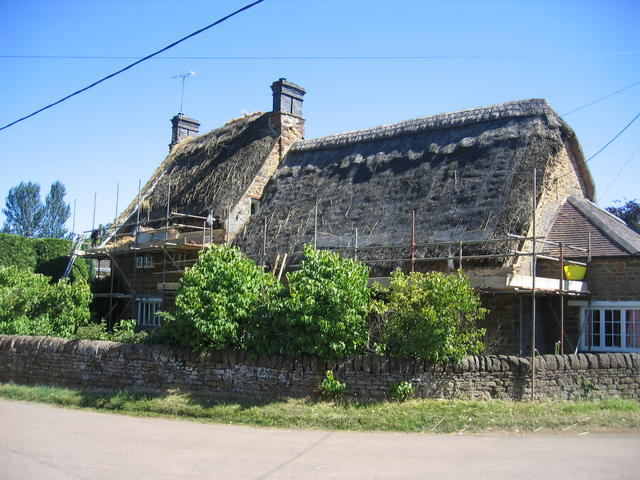
A cottage in Silver Street being thatched in 2006

By the 13th century many of the hundreds in Northamptonshire listed in Domesday had been consolidated, with Chacombe parish within (King's) Sutton Hundred.

The ridge and furrow patterns of Chacombe's former open field system can be traced in much of the parish, particularly from the air. The common fields were enclosed long before the 18th century and without a parliamentary inclosure act. In about 1720 John Bridges wrote that the whole lordship [of Chacombe] was then enclosed and had been so "for near a 100 years".

Before 1901, the hundred court was disused and Chacombe parish part of the Southern Division of Northamptonshire. In 1900 the Great Central Railway branch line between Culworth and Banbury was built along the northern edge of Chacombe parish. In 1911 the railway opened Chalcombe Road Halt just north of the village on Wardington Road. British Railways closed this in 1956 and the whole line in 1966.

The Conservative politician and government minister Norman St John-Stevas, Lord St John of Fawsley, died at Chacombe House care home on 2 March 2012, at the age of 82.

=== Bell-foundry ===
From 1605 until 1785 the Bagley family of Chacombe were bellfounders, casting more than 440 bells for churches in England, including the four 1694 bells in Chacombe parish church. Master-founders at Chacombe included Henry I Bagley (active 1630–1684), Matthew I Bagley (active 1679–1690), Henry II Bagley (active 1679–1703), William Bagley (active 1687–1712), Henry III Bagley (active 1706–1746) and Matthew III Bagley (active 1740–1782).

Henry II Bagley also ran a foundry at Ecton and Henry III Bagley one at Witney. Matthew II Bagley (active 1693–1716) ran two foundries in London: one in Clerkenwell, making bells, and the other, The Foundery, in Moorfields, making cannons.

== School and amenities ==
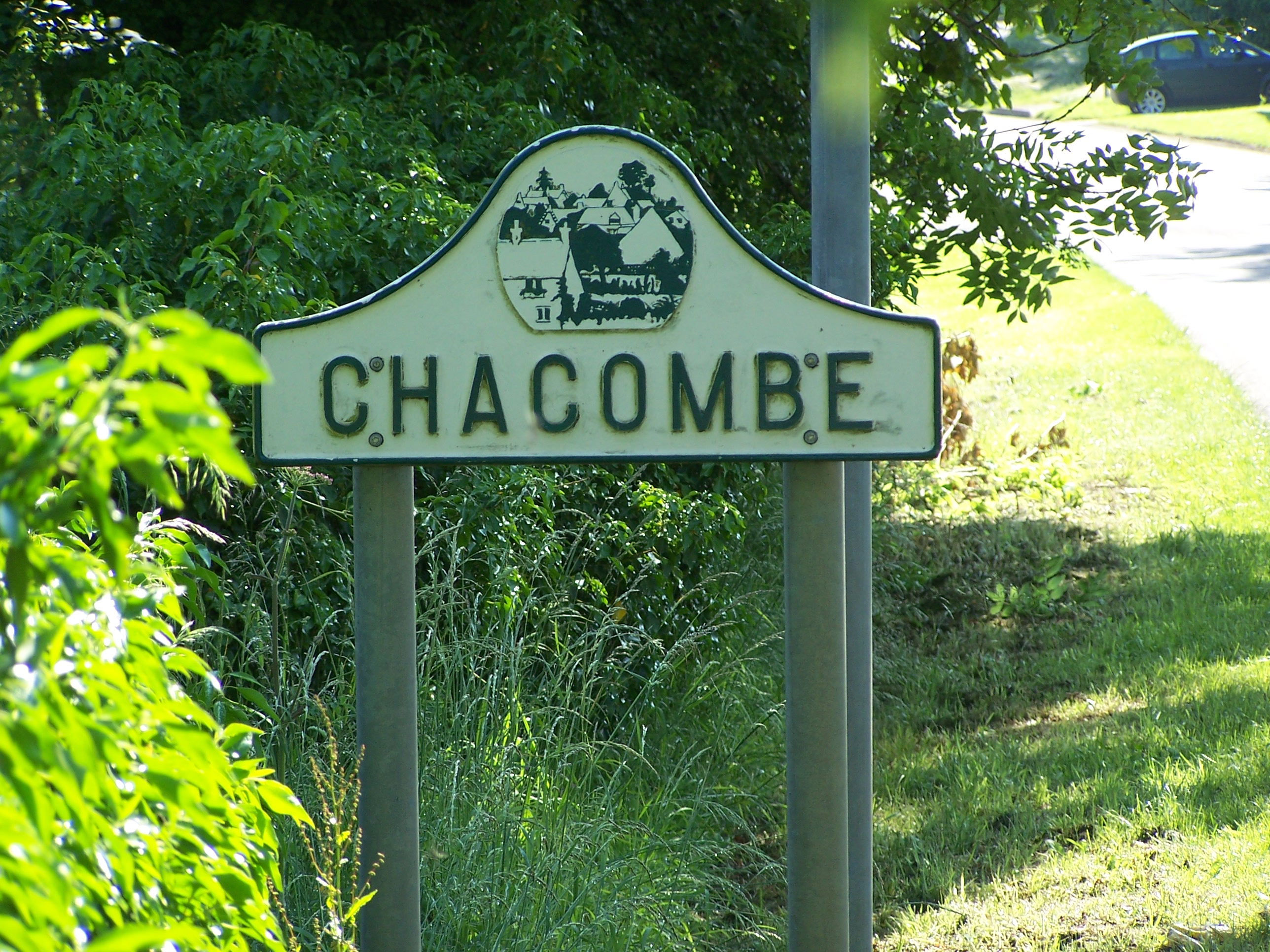
Sign at the entrance to the village

The parish school in Chacombe was founded in 1868. The school is now known as Chacombe CEVA Primary Academy.

The village has a village hall and a public house, the George and Dragon. There is also a care home for the elderly.

Cherwell Edge Golf Club is southeast of the village.

== Sources ==
- Adkins, WRD; Serjeantson, RM, eds. (1902). A History of the County of Northampton. Victoria County History. Vol. 1. Westminster: Archibald Constable & Co. pp. 312, 368.
- Bridges, John (1791). Whalley, Rev. Peter (ed.). The history and antiquities of Northamptonshire. Compiled from the manuscript collections of the late learned antiquary John Bridges, Esq. Vol. I. Oxford: T Payne.
- Gover, JEB; Mawer, A; Stenton, FM (1933). The Place-Names of Northamptonshire. Vol. 10. Cambridge: Cambridge University Press for the English Place-Name Society. ISBN 978-0521049054.
- Kavanagh, Dennis (2016). "Stevas, Norman Antony Francis St John-, Baron St John of Fawsley (1929–2012)". Oxford Dictionary of National Biography. Oxford: Oxford University Press.
- Lewis, Samuel (1848). A Topographical Dictionary of England (7th ed.). London: Samuel Lewis. pp. 242–245.
- Pevsner, Nikolaus; Cherry, Bridget (1973) [1961]. Northamptonshire. The Buildings of England. Harmondsworth: Penguin Books. p. 146. ISBN 0-14-071022-1.
- RCHME, ed. (1982). An Inventory of the Historical Monuments in the County of Northamptonshire. Vol. 4, Archaeological Sites in South-West Northamptonshire. London: Her Majesty's Stationery Office. pp. 26–27.
- Serjeantson, RM; Adkins, WRD, eds. (1906). "The Priory of Chalcombe". A History of the County of Northampton. Victoria County History. Vol. 2. Westminster: Archibald Constable & Co. pp. 133–135.
