= Letcombe Valley =

Nature reserve in Oxfordshire, England

Coordinates: 51.5705°N 1.4572°W

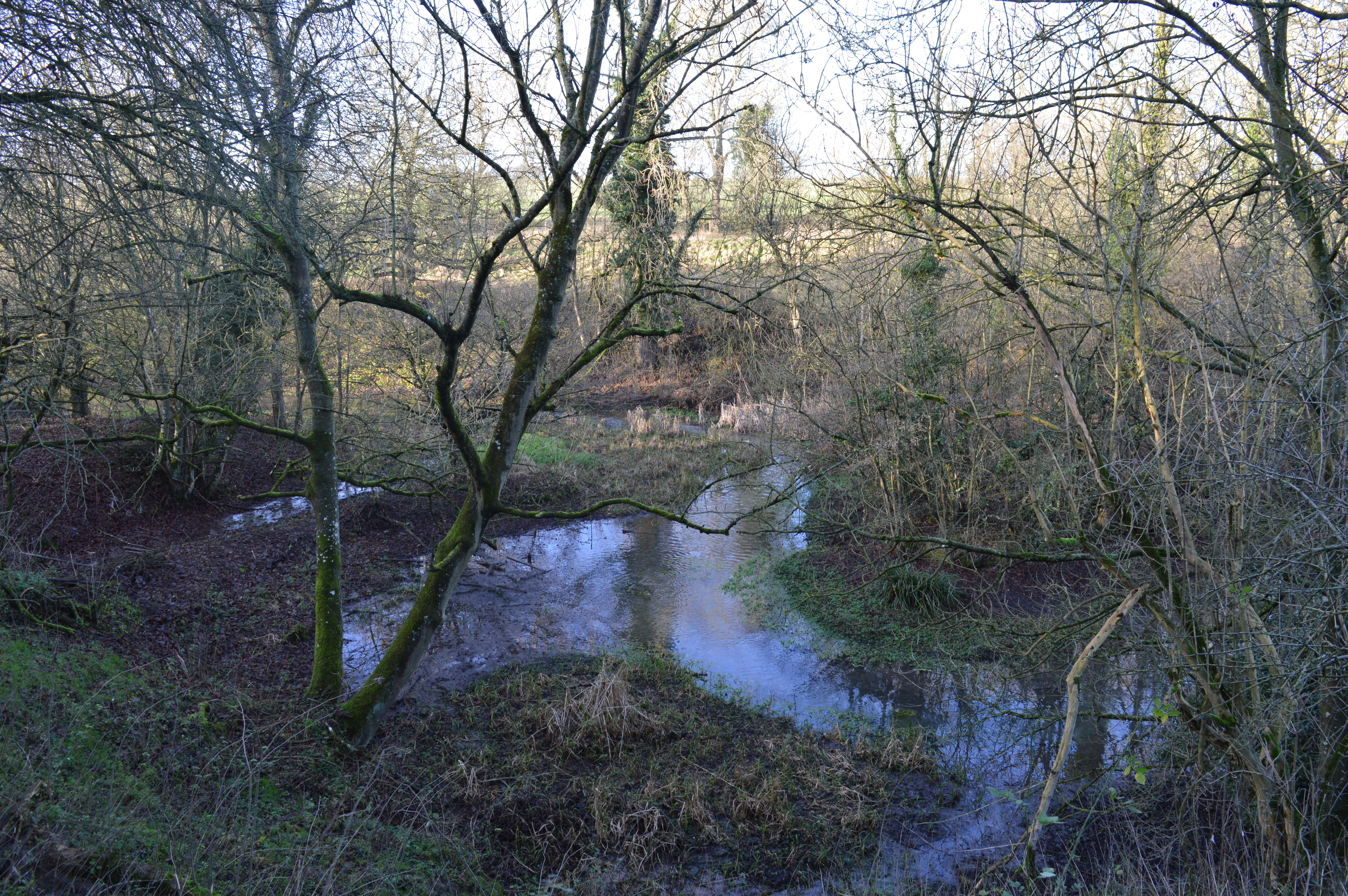
Letcombe Brook in Letcombe Valley

Letcombe Valley is a 7.5-hectare (19-acre) nature reserve south of Letcombe Regis in Oxfordshire. It is managed by the Berkshire, Buckinghamshire and Oxfordshire Wildlife Trust (BBOWT), with the assistance of the Friends of Letcombe Valley.

The reserve was part of a manor formerly known as Benhams, which was purchased in 1851 by a racehorse owner called Thomas Parr. After the Second World War, the manor became a centre for scientific research, which was acquired in 1985 by a chemical company, Dow Elanco. The company created a nature reserve on land next to Letcombe Brook, and when the research centre closed in 2002 the main part of the site was developed for housing. BBOWT was given a fifty-year lease on the nature reserve in 2010 as a condition of planning permission for the housing.

Letcombe Brook, which runs through the reserve, is one of only two chalk streams in Oxfordshire and 161 nationwide. Wildlife includes water voles and fish such as bullhead, brown trout and the primitive brook lamprey. There are also Daubenton's bats, while insects include rare flies. Additional habitats are ancient woodland and a small area of chalk grassland.

There is access from a bridleway at the top of South Street.
