= Letcombe Brook =

Stream in Oxfordshire, England

Coordinates: 51.5815°N 1.4419°W

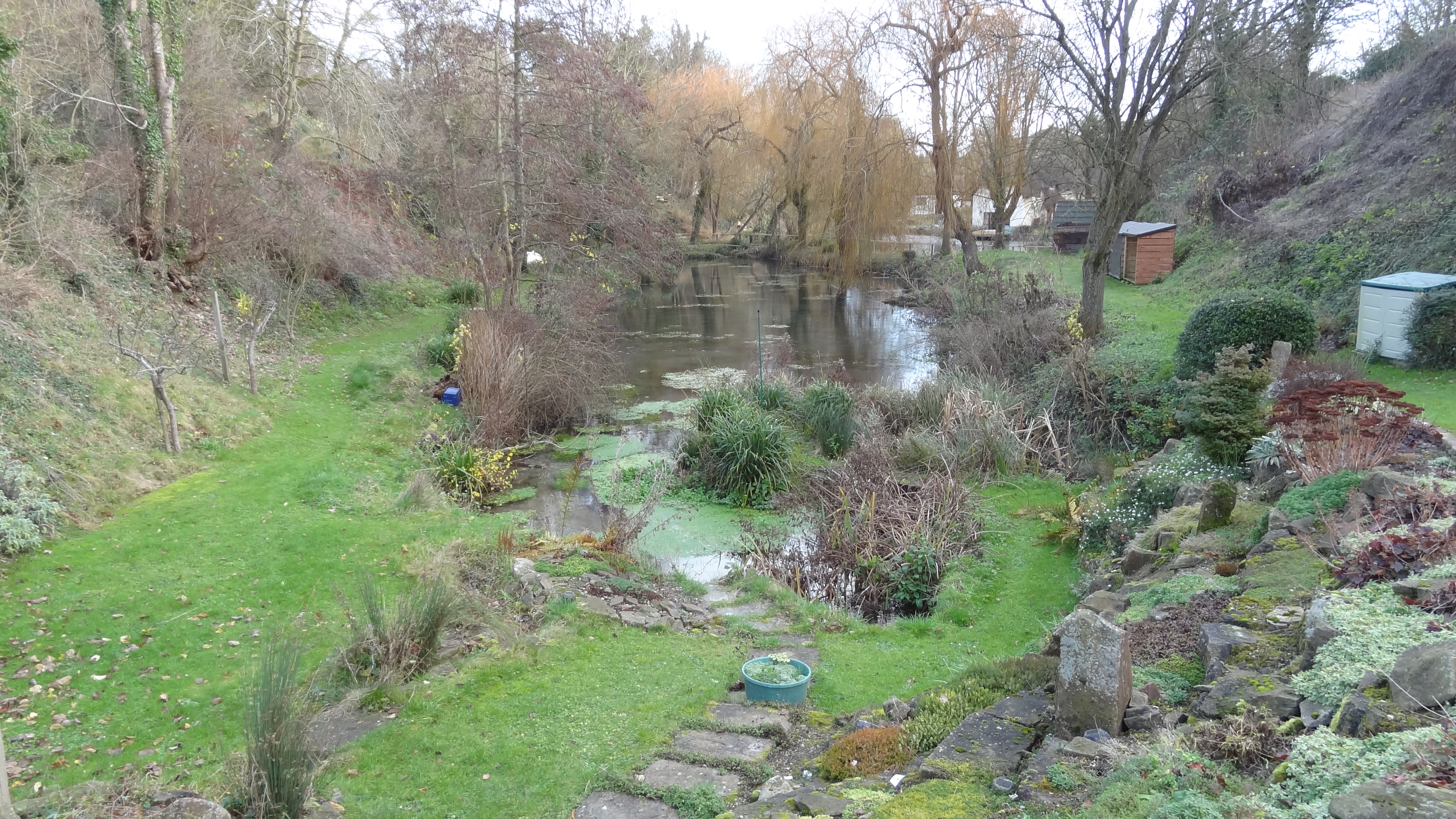
Source of Letcombe Brook in Letcombe Bassett

Letcombe Brook is a 7.5-mile (12 km) stream in the Vale of White Horse in Oxfordshire, England. It rises at the foot of the Berkshire Downs in Letcombe Bassett and flows through Letcombe Regis, Wantage, Grove and East Hanney to join Childrey Brook, which is a tributary of the River Ock, which is a tributary of the River Thames.

Letcombe Brook is a chalk stream, which is globally rare. Development, agriculture and water demand have degraded its habitats, but its water is now cleaner than for many years, and it supports a rich diversity of wildlife, including water voles, bullheads and brook lampreys, which are protected species.

The Letcombe Brook Charitable Trust was established as a memorial to the poet Sir John Betjeman, who lived in the area for many years. In 1972, the year he was appointed Poet Laureate, he wrote the poem "On Leaving Wantage", which begins, "I like the ways these old brick garden walls run unevenly down to Letcombe Brook".

The brook runs through the Letcombe Valley, a 7.5-hectare (19-acre) nature reserve near Letcombe Regis which was opened in 2010. The Berkshire, Buckinghamshire and Oxfordshire Wildlife Trust has been given a 50-year lease and a grant of £230,000 to manage the site as a nature reserve by a local developer.
