= Letcombe Regis =

Village in Oxfordshire, England

Coordinates: 51.576°N 1.453°W

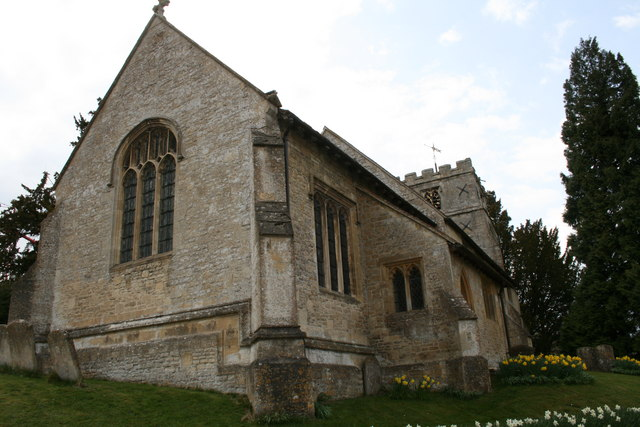
- St Andrew's Church

- Location within Oxfordshire
- Population: 578 (2011 Census)
- OS grid reference: SU3886
- Civil parish: Letcombe Regis
- District: Vale of White Horse
- Shire county: Oxfordshire
- Region: South East
- Country: England
- Sovereign state: United Kingdom
- Post town: Wantage
- Postcode district: OX12
- Dialling code: 01235
- Police: Thames Valley
- Fire: Oxfordshire
- Ambulance: South Central
- UK Parliament: Didcot and Wantage
- Website: Letcombe Regis Parish Council

Letcombe Regis is a village and civil parish in the Vale of White Horse. It was part of Berkshire until the 1974 boundary changes transferred the Vale of White Horse to Oxfordshire. The village is on Letcombe Brook at the foot of the Berkshire Downs escarpment about 1 mile (1.6 km) southwest of the market town of Wantage. The 2011 Census recorded the parish population as 578.

== History ==
The parish includes Segsbury Camp, an Iron Age hill fort on the crest of the Downs just over a mile south of the village. The Domesday Book of 1086 records Letcombe Regis. The name may come from the Old English Ledecumbe meaning the "lede in the combe" – i.e. "the brook in the valley." "Regis" may derive from the Latin 'rex' meaning 'Royal' with 'Regis' meaning The King's, giving, perhaps, "The Kings brook in the valley."

From 1959 to 2002 the Letcombe Laboratory, a major centre for plant research, was located at the Letcombe Manor Estate. The centre was initially a UK government laboratory, but was sold to the chemical company Dow Elanco in 1985.

== Parish church ==
The Church of England parish church of Saint Andrew is a Grade II* listed building. St Andrew's parish is part of the Ridgeway Benefice, along with the parishes of Childrey, Kingston Lisle, Letcombe Bassett, Sparsholt and West Challow.

== Amenities ==
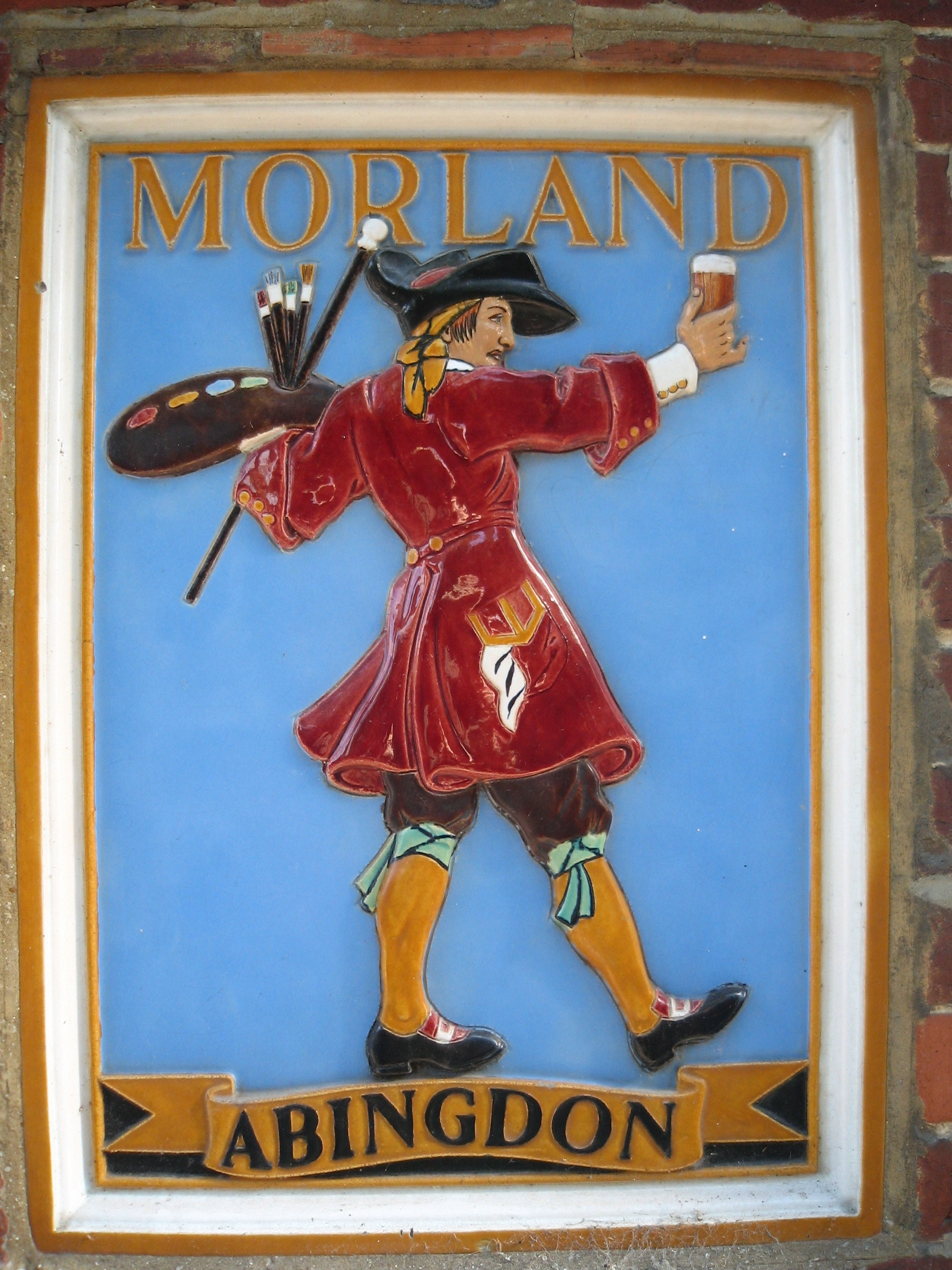
The Morland plaque, the Greyhound Inn

Letcombe Regis has a public house, the Greyhound Inn and a village hall. Letcombe has a non-League football club, Letcombe F.C., which plays at Bassett Road and is a member of Wiltshire League Premier Division.

== See also ==
- Regis (Place)
- List of place names with royal patronage in the United Kingdom

== Bibliography ==
- Ditchfield, P. H.; Page, William, eds. (1924). "Letcombe Regis with East Challow and West Challow". A History of the County of Berkshire. Victoria County History. Vol. IV. assisted by John Hautenville Cope. London: The St Katherine Press. pp. 222–228.
- Ekwall, Eilert (1960) [1936]. Concise Oxford Dictionary of English Place-Names (4th ed.). Oxford: Oxford University Press. Letcombe Basset & Regis. ISBN 0198691033.
- Gilbert, David (2011). "Excavations South Of St Andrew's Church, Letcombe Regis: Prehistoric, Roman, Anglo-Saxon and Saxo-Norman Activity". Oxoniensia. LXXVI. Oxfordshire Architectural and Historical Society: 241–258. ISSN 0308-5562.
- Pevsner, Nikolaus (1966). Berkshire. The Buildings of England. Harmondsworth: Penguin Books. p. 167.
