= Chacombe Priory =

Augustinian priory in Chacombe, England

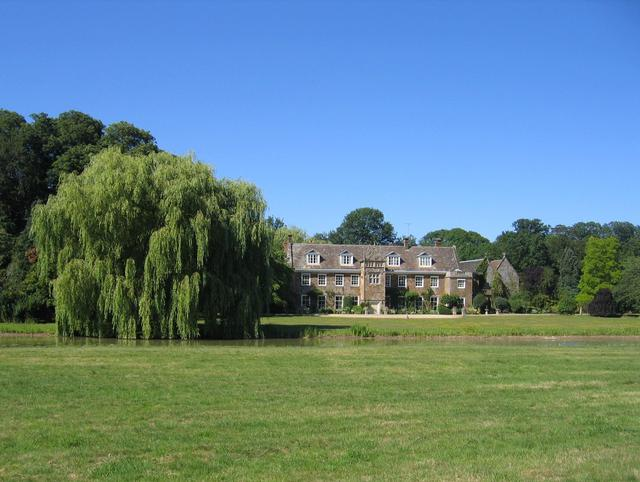
- House on the site of Chacombe Priory

- Location within Northamptonshire

Monastery information
- Order: Augustinian
- Established: 12th century
- Disestablished: 1536

People
- Founder: Hugh de Chacombe

Architecture
- Heritage designation: Grade II* listed
- Designated date: 11 September 1953

Site
- Location: Chacombe, Northamptonshire, England
- Coordinates: 52.0911°N 1.2884°W
- Grid reference: SP48854388
- Visible remains: core of building incorporated into country house; also chapel and medieval fishponds

Chacombe Priory (or Chalcombe Priory) was a priory of Augustinian canons at Chacombe, Northamptonshire, England. Hugh of Chacombe, lord of the manor of Chacombe, founded the priory in the reign of Henry II (1154–89), on low-lying land just west of the village close to the stream. Hugh gave the priory endowments including a yardland at South Newington. In about 1225 the priory's property included eight tenements in Banbury, seven of which it retained until the Dissolution of the Monasteries in the 1530s. By the time of the Hundred Rolls in 1279 the priory owned a tenement in Warwick, where it expanded its holdings until it owned a substantial number of tenements and cottages by the time of the Dissolution.

On 27 September 1535 Sir John Tregonwell reported to Thomas Cromwell:

At Chacombe the prior is newly come, and is competently well learned in Holy Scripture. He is bringing into some order his canons, who are rude and unlearned. I am only afraid that he is too familiar and easy with them.

When the priory was suppressed in 1536 its property included land at Boddington, Northamptonshire, Rotherby, Leicestershire and Wardington, Oxfordshire, and a tenement at Thorpe Mandeville. The priory was purchased at the time of the Dissolution by Michael Fox. In 1543, it was granted to Richard Fox, gentleman of London. Today the only visible remains of the priory are a small chapel apparently built in the 13th century and a set of mediaeval fishponds. However, at least three medieval stone coffin slabs, including one from the 13th century, have been found in the priory grounds.

Part of the priory site is now occupied by a house, also called Chacombe Priory. The house has a large Elizabethan porch and a late 17th-century staircase, and was remodelled in the Georgian era. The house is a Grade II* listed building.

== Burials at the Priory ==
- Nicholas Segrave, 1st Baron Segrave and his wife Maud
- John Segrave, 2nd Baron Segrave
- Stephen Segrave, 3rd Baron Segrave (d. 1325)

== Sources ==
- Baggs, A. P.; Colvin, Christina; Colvin, H. M.; Cooper, Janet; Day, C. J. z; Selwyn, Nesta; Tomkinson, A. (1983). "South Newington". In Crossley, Alan (ed.). A History of the County of Oxford. Victoria County History. Vol. 11: Wootton Hundred (northern part). pp. 143–159.
- Colvin, Christina; Cooper, Janet; Cooper, N. H.; Harvey, P. D. A.; Hollings, Marjory; Hook, Judith; Jessup, Mary; Lobel, Mary D.; Mason, J. F. A.; Trinder; Turner, Hilary (1972). "Banbury – Manors and Other Estates". In Crossley, Alan (ed.). A History of the County of Oxford. Victoria County History. Vol. 10. pp. 42–49.
- Gairdner, James (1886). Letters and Papers, Foreign and Domestic, Henry VIII. Vol. 9 – August–December 1535. Institute of Historical Research. pp. 143–165.
- Gairdner, James (1890). Letters and Papers, Foreign and Domestic, Henry VIII. Vol. 12 Part 1 – February 1537. Institute of Historical Research. pp. 239–254.
- Gairdner, James; Brodie, R.H. (1898). Letters and Papers, Foreign and Domestic, Henry VIII. Vol. 16 – 1540–1541. Institute of Historical Research. pp. 315–331.
- Gairdner, James; Brodie, R.H. (1901). Letters and Papers, Foreign and Domestic, Henry VIII. Vol. 18 part 1 – January–July 1543. Institute of Historical Research. pp. 272–287.
- Gairdner, James; Brodie, R.H. (1902). Letters and Papers, Foreign and Domestic, Henry VIII. Vol. 18 part 2 – August–December 1543. Institute of Historical Research. pp. 227–244.
- Pevsner, Nikolaus; Cherry, Bridget (1973) [1961]. Northamptonshire. The Buildings of England. Harmondsworth: Penguin Books. p. 146. ISBN 0-14-071022-1.
- RCHME, ed. (1982). An Inventory of the Historical Monuments in the County of Northamptonshire. Vol. 4, Archaeological Sites in South-West Northamptonshire. London: Her Majesty's Stationery Office. pp. 26–27.
- Serjeantson, R.M.; Adkins, W.R.D., eds. (1906). "The Priory of Chalcombe". A History of the County of Northampton. Victoria County History. Vol. 2. Archibald Constable & Co. pp. 133–135.
- Stephens, W.B., ed. (1969). "The Borough of Warwick – Economic and Social History to 1545". A History of the County of Warwick. Victoria County History. Vol. 8: The City of Coventry and Borough of Warwick. pp. 480–489.
