= Katharine Georgina Pearce =

British botanist

Katharine Georgina "Kit" Pearce (born 1950), is a British botanist and forest ecologist.

Pearce was born 1950 in Wantage, attended Alness Academy and studied Plant taxonomy at the University of Birmingham, where she was awarded a Ph.D. degree in 1975 for her thesis "Solanum Melongena L. and Related Species".

She has lectured at the Department of Botany, University of Malaya and at the Universiti Pertanian Malaysia. She has been a consultant for the Sarawak Forest Department for botanical, forestry and conservation management projects. She has carried out work for the Tree Flora of Sabah and Sarawak Project and for the Sarawak Forest Department/DANIDA Project in Niah National Park (2004). In 2006, she worked on the flora of the new Pulong Tau National Park, has worked on The Cultured Rainforest Project, and has been a consultant for the Sarawak Timber Association (STA). In 2020 she was co-advisor on the Beccari Centenary Project.

Pearce was married to Robert (Bob) Lian-Saging (d 2023), also known as Balangalibun, their Kelabit name, and lives in Kuching, Malaysia.

== Selected publications ==
- An Ethnobotanical Study of An Iban Community of the Pantu Sub-district, Sri Aman, Division 2, Sarawak. Pearce, Katherine G., Victor, Luna Amen and Surik Jok (1987). The Sarawak Museum Journal. 37(58) 193–270.
- Conservation status of palms in Sarawak. Pearce, K.G., (1989). Malayan Naturalist 43 (1&2): 20–36.
- Palms. (1991). Kiew, R. and Pearce, K.G. In The state of nature conservation in Malaysia, 95–100. (R. Kiew, ed.). Malayan Nature Society, Kuala Lumpur.
- Palm Utilization and Conservation in Sarawak (Malaysia). K. G. Pearce, Dennis Johnson. 1991.
- Floristic Inventory for the Development of Lanjak-Entimau Wildlife Sanctuary as a Totally Protected Area. ITTO Project Phase Il. Pearce, K. (1999).
- The palms of Kubah National Park, Matang, Kuching Division, Sarawak. Pearce, Katharine G. & Dransfield, John (1992)
- The Vegetation and Plants of Niah National Park, Borneo. Pearce, K.G. (2004). The Gardens' bulletin, Singapore 56:101-145.
- Compiling and Editing the Workshop Proceeding of the “Ramin Technical Report” for the “Joint Working Group Malaysia-The Netherlands: Sustainable Management of Peat Swamp Forests of Sarawak with Special Reference to Ramin”. Meer, P. J. van der; Chai, F.Y.C.; Hillegers, P.J.M.; Pearce, K.G. (2005). Published by Alterra, Wageningen UR, The Netherlands; Sarawak Forest Department, Malaysia and Sarawak Forestry Corporation, Malaysia.
- The Flora of Pulong Tau National Park. Project Report for “Transboundary Biodiversity and Conservation Area: The Pulong Tau National Park, Sarawak State, Malaysia, Serial number PD 224/03 Rev. 1 (F).” Pearce, Katherine G. (2006). Yokahama and Kuching: International Tropical Timber Organization, Sarawak Forest Department and Sarawak Forestry Corporation.
- Final Technical Report. ITTO Project PD 12/99 Rev.4(F). Model Forest Management Area. (MFMA) - Phase III. Compiled by: K. G. Pearce. (2007).
- A pollen morphology study from the Kelabit Highlands of Sarawak, Malaysian Borneo. Jones, Samantha Elsie & Pearce, Katharine Georgina. Palynology, 39:2, 150–204, (2015) doi:10.1080/01916122.2014.940472
- Odoardo Beccari Centenary - Revealing Sarawak’s Biodiversity. Pearce, Katharine Georgina and Mashman, Valerie. The Malayan Nature Journal 81st Anniversary Special Edition 2021, 255 - 265 (2021)

Data related to Katharine Georgina Pearce at Wikispecies
