= Wantage =

Town and civil parish in Oxfordshire, England

Coordinates: 51°35′20″N 1°25′37″W

- Town and civil parish
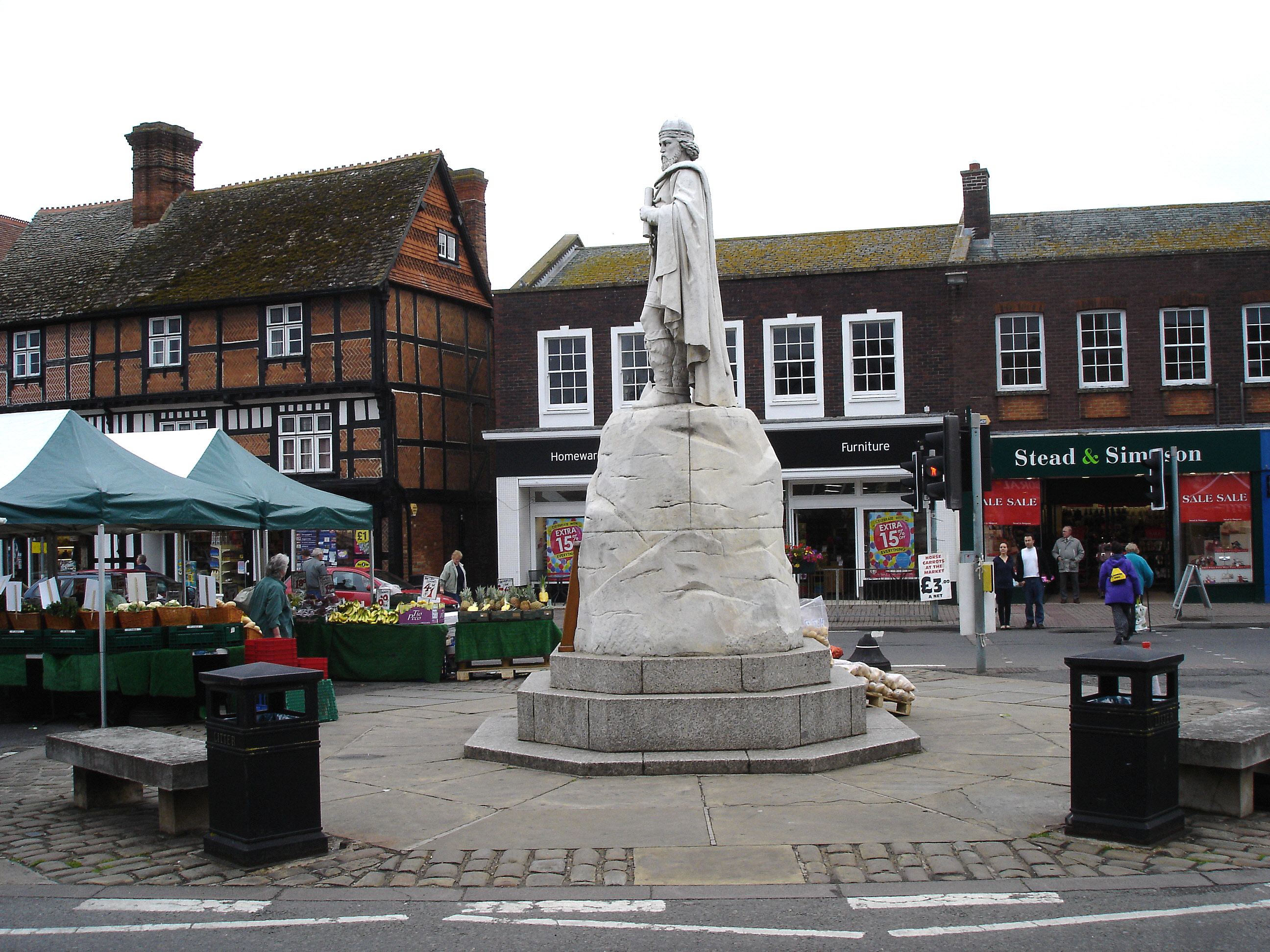
- Wantage Market Place with its statue of King Alfred the Great, born in Wantage

- Location within Oxfordshire
- Population: 13,106 (2021 Census)
- OS grid reference: SU3987
  - London: 57 miles (92 km)
- Civil parish: Wantage
- District: Vale of White Horse
- Shire county: Oxfordshire
- Region: South East
- Country: England
- Sovereign state: United Kingdom
- Post town: Wantage
- Postcode district: OX12
- Dialling code: 01235
- Police: Thames Valley
- Fire: Oxfordshire
- Ambulance: South Central
- UK Parliament: Didcot and Wantage
- Website: Wantage.com Gateway to Wantage

Wantage (/ˈwɒntɪdʒ/) is a historic market town and civil parish at the foot of the Berkshire Downs in the Vale of White Horse, Oxfordshire, England. Historically in Berkshire, it has been administered as part of Oxfordshire since 1974. The town is on Letcombe Brook, 8 miles (13 km) south-west of Abingdon, 14 miles (23 km) north-west of Newbury, and 15 miles (24 km) south-west of Oxford.

It was the birthplace of King Alfred the Great in 849.

== History ==
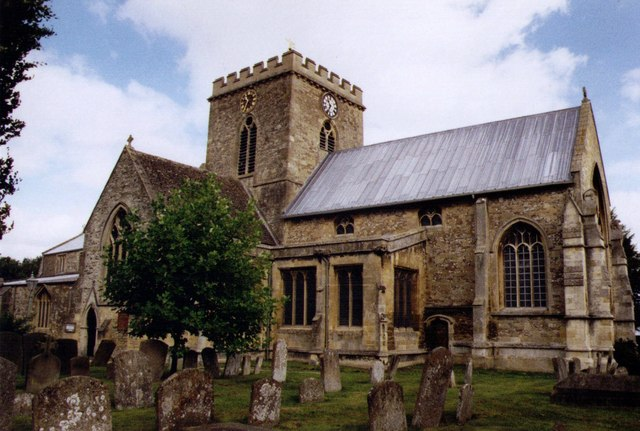
Saints Peter and Paul Parish Church

Wantage was a small Roman settlement but the origin of the toponym is somewhat uncertain. It was seemingly named after a stream that was there originally, with possible etymology being 'to wane, decrease' or an intermittent stream. King Alfred the Great was born at the royal palace there in the 9th century, in what was originally known as Wanating. Wantage appears in the Domesday Book of 1086. Its value was £61 and it was in the king's ownership until Richard I passed it to the Earl of Albemarle in 1190. Weekly trading rights were first granted to the town by Henry III in 1246. Markets are now held twice weekly on Wednesdays and Saturdays. Royalist troops were stationed in Wantage during the English Civil War.

In the 19th century, Lord Wantage became a notable local and national benefactor. He was very involved in founding the British Red Cross Society. In 1877 he paid for a marble statue of King Alfred by Count Gleichen to be erected in Wantage market place, where it still stands today. He also donated the Victoria Cross Gallery to the town. This contained paintings by Louis William Desanges depicting deeds which led to the award of a number of VCs, including his own gained during the Crimean War. It is now a shopping arcade. Wantage is home to the Community of Saint Mary the Virgin, founded by the vicar of Wantage William John Butler in 1848; it was once one of the largest communities of Anglican nuns in the world. Wantage once had two breweries which were taken over by Morlands of Abingdon. In 1988 the town was thrust into the headlines after a Brass Tacks programme entitled "Shire Wars" exposed the drunken violence that plagued the town and surrounding villages at that time.

== Governance ==
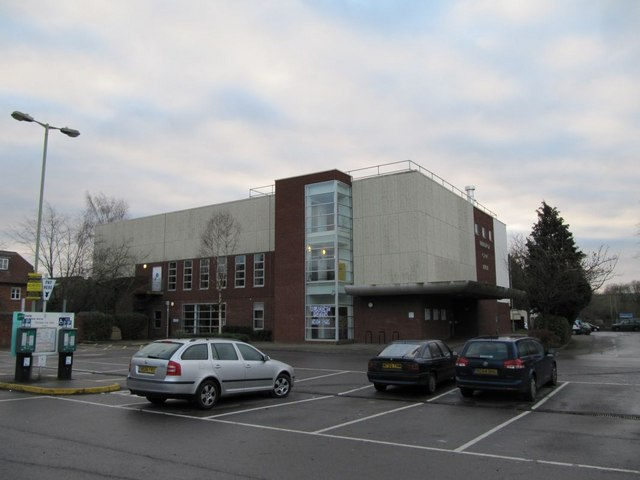
The Beacon, Portway: Community centre and headquarters of town council

There are three tiers of local government covering Wantage, at civil parish (town), district, and county level: Wantage Town Council, Vale of White Horse District Council, and Oxfordshire County Council. The town council is based at the council offices at The Beacon on Portway, formerly known as the Civic Hall, which also serves as an events venue.

Wantage is part of the Didcot and Wantage constituency which is currently represented in the House of Commons by Liberal Democrat MP Olly Glover who was first elected in the 2024 general election. The constituency was first contested at the 2024 general election after the former Wantage constituency was abolished following the completion of the 2023 Periodic Review of Westminster constituencies.

=== Administrative history ===
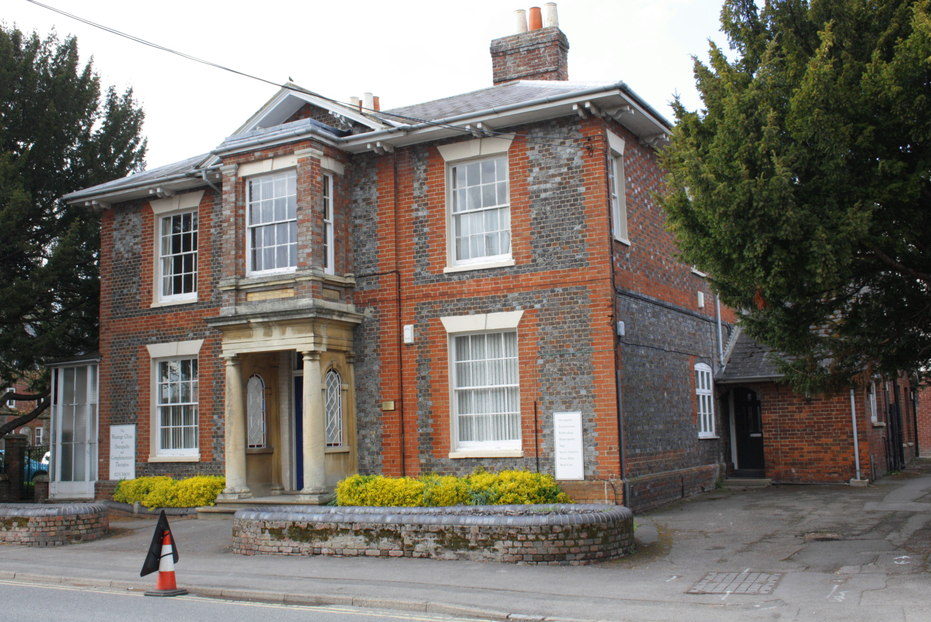
Orchard House, Portway: former offices of Wantage Urban District Council

Wantage was an ancient parish in the Wantage hundred of Berkshire. The parish was subdivided into four townships, being Charlton, Grove, West Lockinge, and a Wantage township which included the town itself. Such townships were all declared to be separate civil parishes in 1866.

Wantage was sometimes described as a borough, particularly in the 18th century, but it lacked the bodies and powers that boroughs typically had. A body of improvement commissioners for the Wantage township was established in 1828 in order to provide local government functions. Such improvement commissioners' districts were reconstituted as urban districts under the Local Government Act 1894.

The urban district was enlarged in 1934 to absorb Charlton. The urban district council established its offices at Orchard House on Portway. Between 1894 and 1974 there was also a Wantage Rural District which administered the rural area surrounding the town; the rural district council was based at Belmont.

Wantage Urban District was abolished in 1974 under the Local Government Act 1972, which also transferred Wantage from Berkshire to Oxfordshire. A successor parish covering the area of the former urban district was created in 1974, with its council taking the name Wantage Town Council. A new Civic Hall was built on the former gardens of Orchard House during 1974; the building opened in January 1975 and was later renamed The Beacon.

== Geography ==
Wantage is at the foot of the Berkshire Downs escarpment in the Vale of the White Horse. There are gallops at Black Bushes and nearby villages with racing stables at East Hendred, Letcombe Bassett, Lockinge and Uffington. Wantage includes the suburbs of Belmont to the west and Charlton to the east. Grove to the north is still just about detached and is a separate parish. Wantage parish stretches from the northern edge of its housing up onto the Downs in the south, covering Chain Hill, Edge Hill, Wantage Down, Furzewick Down and Lattin Down. The Edgehill Springs rise between Manor Road and Spike Lodge Farms and the Letcombe Brook flows through the town. Wantage is home to the Vale and Downland Museum. There is a large market square containing a statue of King Alfred, surrounded by shops some with 18th-century facades. Quieter streets radiate from it, including one towards the large Church of England parish church. Wantage is the "Alfredston" of Thomas Hardy's Jude the Obscure.

== Transport ==
Wantage is at the crossing of the B4507 valley road, the A417 road between Streatley and Cirencester, the A338 road between Hungerford (and junction 14 of the M4 motorway) and Oxford, and the B4494 road to Newbury.

Wantage is served by buses linking the town with Oxford and other nearby towns and villages. Stagecoach West operates services between Oxford, Botley, Cumnor, East Hanney, Grove and Wantage. Thames Travel operates services to Didcot, GWP North, Harwell Campus, East Hendred, Wantage, Grove, East Hanney, Abingdon, Milton Park, Steventon, East Challow, Stanford in the Vale and Faringdon, Childrey and Uffington.. Night buses also operates a late night services between Wantage, Abingdon and Oxford.

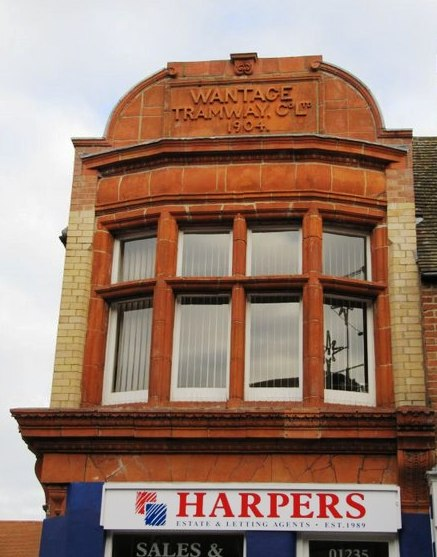
The former head office of the Wantage Tramway Company in Mill Street

Wantage does not have a railway station; Didcot Parkway, 8 miles to the east, is the nearest station, with services towards Reading, Oxford, London, Bristol and Cheltenham. The Great Western Main Line is just north of Grove (2 miles north of Wantage) where the former Wantage Road railway station used to be. It was closed during the Beeching cuts in 1964. The Wantage Tramway used to link Wantage with Wantage Road station. The tramway's Wantage terminus was in Mill Street and its building survives, but little trace remains of the route. One of the tramway's locomotives, Shannon, alias Jane, is preserved at Didcot Railway Centre. Oxfordshire County Council have ambitions to open a railway station on the former Wantage Road site. In 2018 a feasibility study was carried out for a new Wantage & Grove Parkway station with the hope that the proposed station could be served by a new service operating between Bristol and Oxford. The proposed station received backing from Network Rail in 2021 after a new Oxfordshire rail study was published, which recommended a new station at Wantage/Grove, subject to additional main line infrastructure.

A section of the Wilts & Berks Canal passes through the parish.

== Education ==
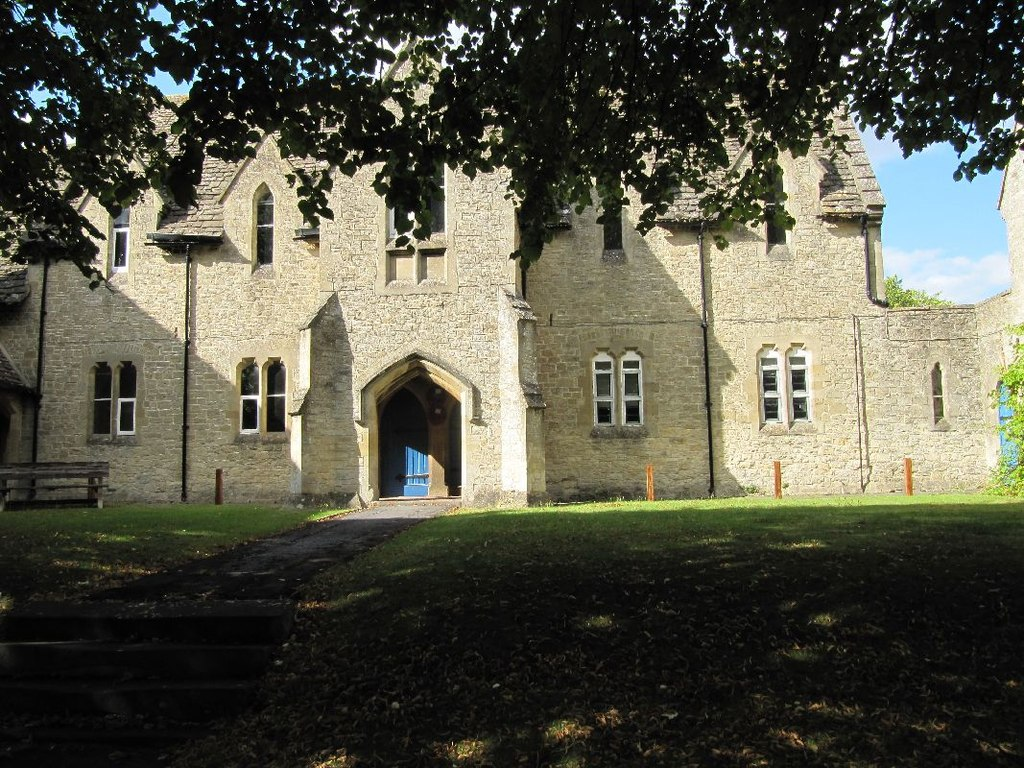
Front of King Alfred's Academy Centre Site

There is one state secondary school in Wantage, King Alfred's Academy, and approximately ten primary schools. The secondary school converted into an academy in 2011 and was rated Outstanding by Ofsted in that year.

Between 1873 and 2006, an Anglican private girls' school, St Mary's School, was located in Wantage. The school closed in 2006 when St. Mary's merged with Heathfield School, Ascot. A former independent preparatory school, St Andrew's, established in 1926, closed permanently in 2010.

Fitzwaryn School, a school catering for children with special needs aged 3–19, is situated in Wantage. The school was rated Outstanding by Ofsted in 2014. It is named after the ancient lords of the manor of Wantage, the FitzWarin family, powerful Marcher Lords seated at Whittington Castle in Shropshire.

In October 2013, the Vale Academy Trust was created when King Alfred's Academy, Charlton Primary School and Wantage CE Primary School came together to form a partnership. The trust was founded by local heads, governors and other stakeholders in the hope of creating quality partnerships among the schools to ensure higher quality education for the area. Since the trust was formed in 2013, three other primary schools in the area have joined. The Vale Academy Trust announced plans in September 2016 to build a brand new free school in Grove for children from the ages of two to sixteen. The school is planned to have a capacity of up to 1,000 students and hoped to open in 2019 in preparation for large scale housing developments that are planned for Wantage and Grove but has not yet been built (March 2021).

== Media ==
Local news and television programmes are provided by BBC South and ITV Meridian. Television signals are received from the Oxford TV transmitter.

Wantage's local radio stations are BBC Radio Oxford and Heart South.

Local newspapers are the Wantage & Grove Herald and Oxfordshire Guardian.

== Architecture ==
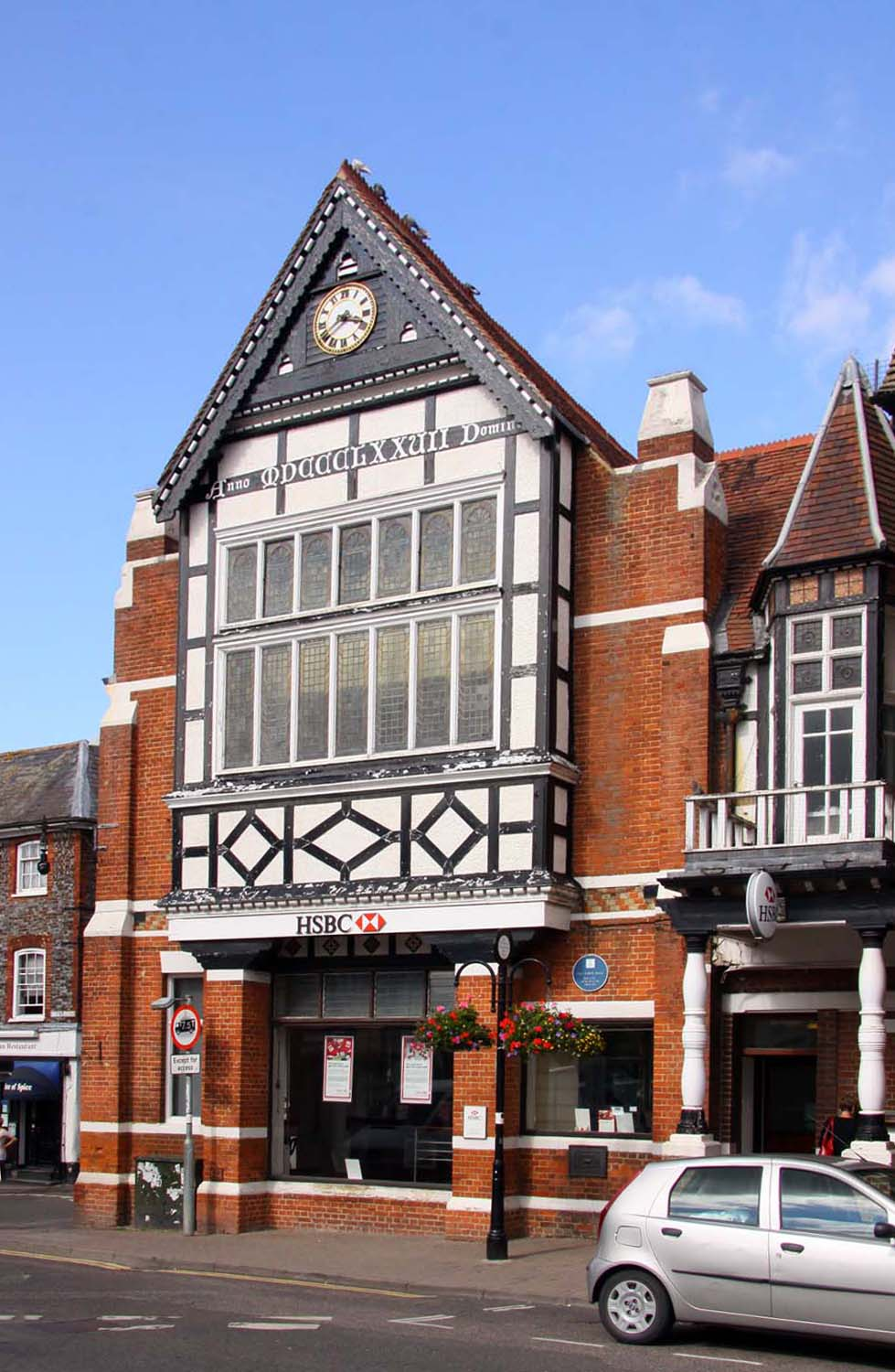
The Old Town Hall, Wantage, completed in 1878

Wantage has been the site of a church since at least the 10th century and the present Church of England parish church of Saints Peter and Paul dates from the 13th century, with many additions since. Saints' Peter and Paul contains seventeen 15th-century misericords.

King Alfred's Grammar School was designed by the architect J. B. Clacy of Reading and built in 1849–50 but incorporates a highly carved Norman doorway from a demolished chantry chapel that formerly stood in the churchyard. The Old Town Hall in Wantage was completed in 1878.

== Developments ==
In recent years four or more significant housing developments have been constructed. At least one development (including the new health centre) has been on a greenfield site adjacent to the A338 road towards Oxford. The other three, however, have been on brownfield sites, converting a scrapyard next to the Letcombe Brook.

In 2006, a commercial development began construction with a Sainsbury's supermarket as a focus. This supermarket is double the size of the previous one and was intended to have a significant impact on the town by drawing more visitors from outlying villages. The impact was projected as being positive, aimed at preventing the town becoming a commuter town and retaining some commercial activity. An action group, Wantage Rejuvenated, is being sponsored by the town's chamber of commerce to try to bring business back into the area and inject new life into the town.

There was activism in the town regarding development in 2011, with a campaign to stop the demolition of a building close to the town centre by Vanderbilt Homes, who initially gained permission to convert an early Georgian bank of shops into a mixed commercial and residential block. Vanderbilt applied to have the buildings completely demolished, prompting a local petition and campaign for the application to be refused at the discretion of the Town Council, as although the building is old, it is not listed.

Another area of development which has provoked local protest has been on the north of the town, where a 1,500-home estate is proposed, increasing housing in the town by 35%. Residents launched petitions and the then local MP, Ed Vaizey, raised concerns, especially regarding the ability of local road infrastructure to cope. The town is served by the A338 and A417, which are single-carriageway roads. The proposed Wantage development is one mile from a similar mass of 2,500 homes proposed for the village of Grove and which will use the same road network.

In 2014 Wantage was nominated for the Government's Great British High Street Award whereby Wantage won the award for Britain's Best Town Centre beating several other towns nominated for the award.

== Sport and leisure ==
Wantage has a non-League football club: Wantage Town F.C., who play at Alfredian Park in the Southern Football League. Grove is also the home to Formula One constructor Williams Grand Prix Engineering.

Wantage & Grove Cricket Club's first recorded match was in 1863. The club has three teams and play in Charlton, Wantage.

On 12 September 2014, cyclists competing in the 2014 Tour of Britain passed through Wantage during Stage 6 of the event. The participants entered Wantage via the B4494 road and left via the A417 towards Harwell and then on towards the end of the stage at Hemel Hempstead.

White Horse Harriers AC is an athletics club based in Wantage and Grove. They organise the annual White Horse Half Marathon, which starts and finishes in Grove.

Corallian Cycling Club was founded in 2016 and organises regular sociable cycle rides from Wantage Market Place.

== Notable people ==
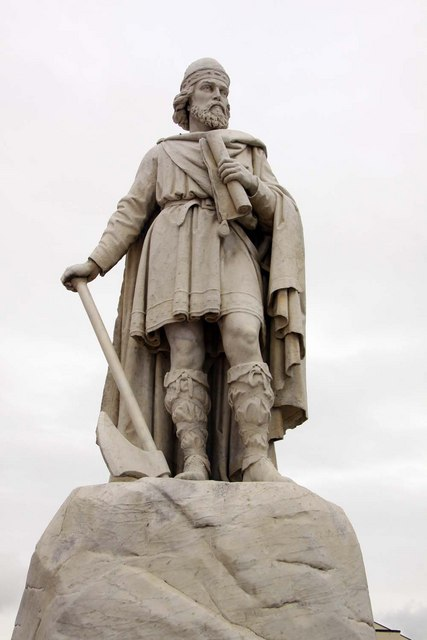
Statue of Alfred the Great, by Prince Victor of Hohenlohe-Langenburg

- King Alfred the Great (ca.848/849 – 899), King of the Anglo-Saxons from 886, born in Wantage.
- John Betjeman (1906–1984), Poet Laureate from 1972 to 1984, lived in Wantage and his book Archie and the Strict Baptists is based in the town. Wantage has a memorial park named after him, which includes extracts from his poems in a peaceful wooded area.
- James Brooks (1825–1901), Gothic Revival architect, born in Hatford.
- Joseph Butler (1692–1752), Bishop of Bristol, Bishop of Durham, and author of The Analogy of Religion, was born and educated in Wantage.
- William John Butler (1818–1894), Vicar of Wantage, Dean of Lincoln.
- Alice FitzWarin, wife of Dick Whittington (ca.1354–1423), three-time Lord Mayor of the City of London, grew up in Wantage. Her father's brass memorial is in the church.
- Sir John Hobbis Harris (1874–1940), missionary, politician and campaigner against slavery.
- Isaac Kimber (1692–1755), born in Wantage, Baptist minister, biographer, historian and journalist.
- Archie Kirkman Loyd (1847–1922), former MP, lived in Wantage.
- Robert Loyd-Lindsay, 1st Baron Wantage, VC (1832–1901), soldier, politician, philanthropist and benefactor to Wantage.
- Mother Maribel of Wantage (1887–1970), Anglican nun, artist and sculptor.
- Frances O'Connor (born 1967), actor, born in Wantage, emigrated aged two to Perth, Australia.
- Katharine Georgina Pearce (born 1950), botanist and forest ecologist, lives in Kuching, Malaysia.
- Lester Piggott (1935–2022), jockey, born in Wantage.
- Thomas William Shore (1840–1905), geologist and antiquarian, born in Wantage.
- Ed Vaizey, Baron Vaizey of Didcot, (born 1968), politician, media commentator; Government minister and MP for Wantage from 2005 to 2019.
- Caroline Voaden (born 1968), Liberal Democrat former MEP.

=== Sport ===
- Leigh Bedwell (born 1994), former goalkeeper for Swindon Town (currently playing for Didcot Town), was born in Wantage.
- Roy Burton (born 1951), former Oxford United and Witney Town goalkeeper, was born in Wantage.
- Edward Cawston (1911–1998), former English cricketer, born in Wantage.
- Hugh Johns (1922–2007) former ITV football commentator, born in Wantage.
- Tony Murray (1950-1992}, classic-winning jockey, born in Wantage.

== Town crier ==
Wantage reinstated its town crier position in the 2010s. A voluntary and ceremonial position, the town crier attends local events such as Alfred's Day, Remembrance Sunday parade and Christmas Eve carols in the square to promote local culture and history. The town crier wears a red and gold uniform adorned with the golden wyvern of Wessex.

== Twinning ==
Wantage is twinned with:

- Mably in France since 1990
- Seesen in Germany since 1979

== See also ==
- Icknield Way Morris Men, a traditional dance troupe in Wantage.

== Sources ==
- Aston, Michael; Bond, James (1976). The Landscape of Towns. Archaeology in the Field Series. London: J.M. Dent & Sons Ltd. p. 96. ISBN 0-460-04194-0.
- Page, W.H.; Ditchfield, P.H., eds. (1924). A History of the County of Berkshire. Victoria County History. Vol. 4. assisted by John Hautenville Cope. London: The St Katherine Press. pp. 319–332.
- Pevsner, Nikolaus (1966). Berkshire. The Buildings of England. Harmondsworth: Penguin Books. pp. 252–256.
