= Statue of Alfred the Great, Wantage =

Statue in Wantage, Oxfordshire, England

Coordinates: 51°35′19″N 1°25′35″W

Statue of Alfred the Great
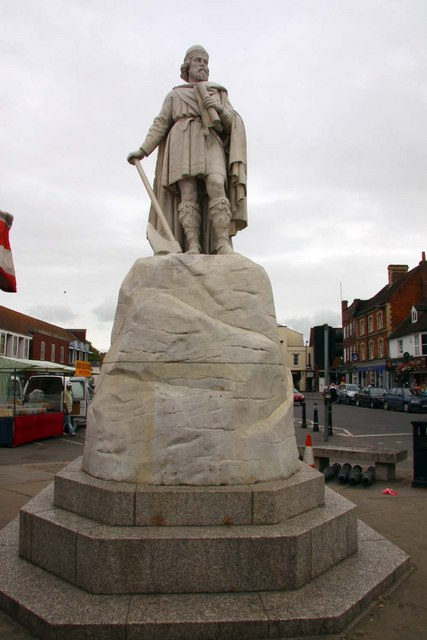
- Statue of King Alfred in Wantage Market Square
- Artist: Count Gleichen
- Completion date: 14 July 1877
- Subject: Alfred The Great
- Location: Wantage

The statue of Alfred the Great, in the Wantage market place, was sculpted by Count Gleichen, a relative of Queen Victoria's, and unveiled on 14 July 1877 by the Prince and Princess of Wales. It was presented to the town by Robert Loyd-Lindsay, 1st Baron Wantage. It depicts the 9th-century King Alfred the Great, who was born in the town.

The Grade II listed statue was vandalised on New Year's Eve 2007, losing part of its right arm and axe. After the arm and axe were replaced the statue was again vandalised on Christmas Eve 2008, losing its axe.

== See also ==
- Alfred the Great
