= Oxfordshire Blue Plaques Board =

Anonymous voluntary historic board

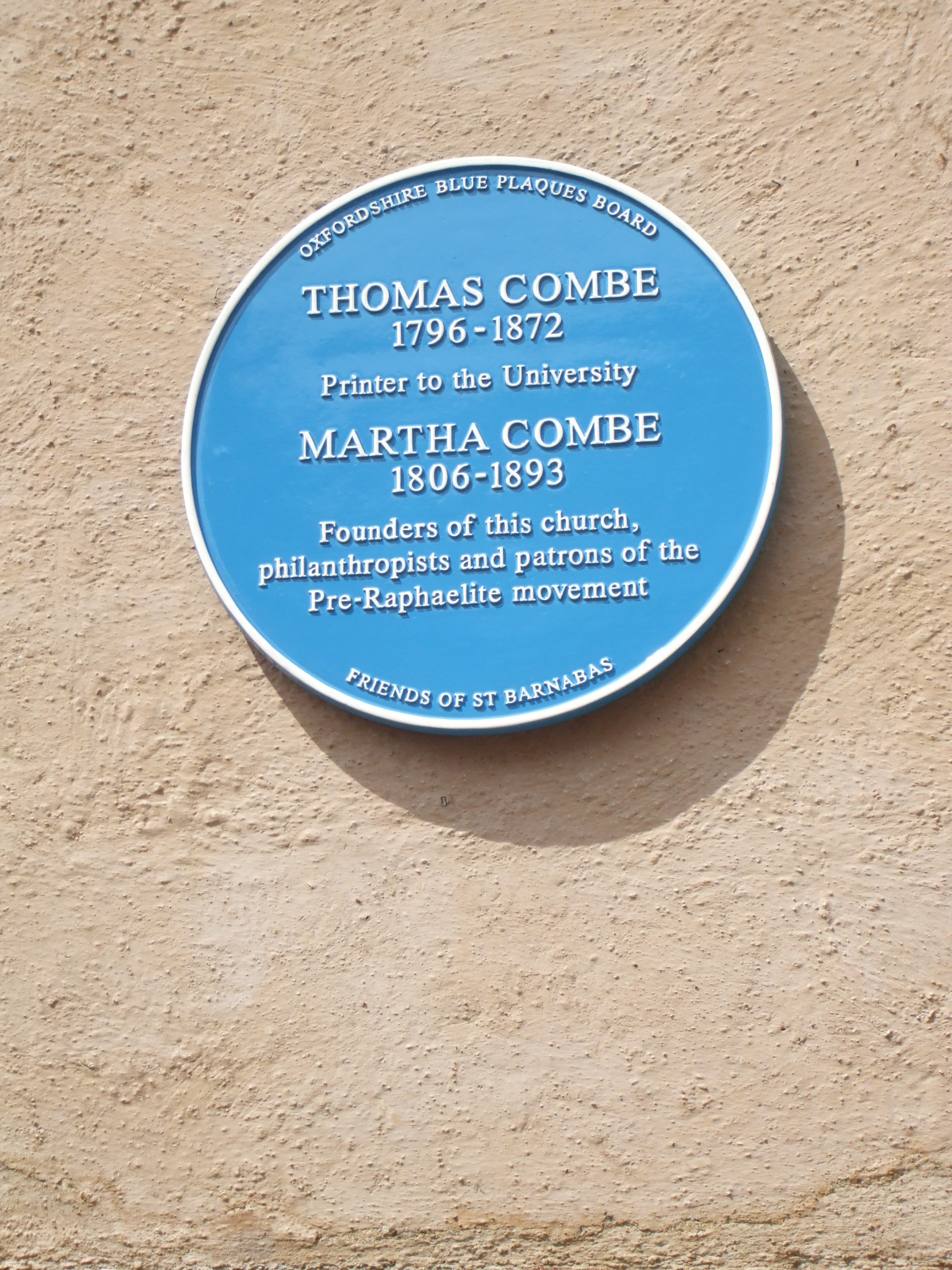
The plaque commemorating Thomas and Martha Combe in Jericho, Oxford.

The Oxfordshire Blue Plaques Board established in 1999 was the brainchild of Sir Hugo Brunner, then Lord Lieutenant of Oxfordshire, and Edwin Townsend-Coles, Chairman of the Oxford Civic Society. The Board is an autonomous voluntary body whose members are drawn from cultural organisations and local government across the county. It awards and installs blue plaques on buildings in Oxford and Oxfordshire to commemorate very remarkable residents and, occasionally, historic events. For more detailed information, see the Board's website.

== Blue plaques in the City of Oxford ==
Blue plaques in the City of Oxford
Name	Date(s)	Notable for	Address	Unveiling
Sarah Angelina Acland	1849–1930	Photographer	10 Park Town	24 July 2016
Andrea Angel	1877–1917	Oxford chemist and home-front hero	15 Banbury Road	14 July 2018
Ronnie Barker	1929–2005	Actor and comedian	23 Church Cowley Road	29 September 2012
Abel Beesley	1851–1921	Waterman and punting legend	4 Upper Fisher Row	26 June 2021
Frank Bellamy; Ethel Bellamy	1863–1936; 1881–1960	Astronomer, philatelist; Seismologist, astronomer	2 Winchester Road	8 October 2019
Richard Meux Benson	1824–1915	Vicar of Cowley and benefactor, founder of the Society of St John the Evangelist	16 Marston Street	9 May 2013
Sir Isaiah Berlin	1909–1997	Philosopher, historian of ideas	Headington House, Old High Street, Headington	7 June 2009
Beatrice Mary Blackwood	1889–1975	Anthropologist, museum curator	45 Walton Street	29 May 2026
Elizabeth Bowen	1899–1973	Author	The Coach House, The Croft, Headington	19 October 2014
John Henry Brookes	1891–1975	Artist, craftsman, educationist	195 The Slade, Headington	16 March 2011
Edward Brooks (VC)	1883–1944	Company Sergeant Major	16 Windsor Street, Headington	29 July 2017
Rhoda Broughton	1840–1920	Popular novelist, independent woman, and wit	River View, Headington Hill	22 October 2020
John Chessell Buckler	1793–1894	Artist, antiquarian, architect	58 Holywell Street	30 October 2015
Jane Burden	1839–1914	Pre-Raphaelite model and wife of William Morris	St Helen's Passage	19 October 2007
Violet Butler	1884–1982	Social reformer, social work trainer	14 Norham Gardens	29 October 2021
Nirad Chaudhuri	1897–1999	Writer	20 Lathbury Road	4 October 2008
Noel Chavasse	1884–1917	VC and Bar	Magdalen College School	30 September 2005
Chiang Yee	1903–1977	Artist and writer	28 Southmoor Road	29 June 2019
Civil War	1646	Surrender of Oxford in 1646	Cromwell House, 17 Mill Lane, Old Marston	16 June 2013
Thomas Combe; Martha Combe	1796–1872; 1806–1893	Printer; Patron of the arts	St Barnabas Church	25 February 2007
Sarah Cooper	1848–1932	Marmalade maker	83 High Street	10 October 2001
The Cutteslowe Walls	1934–1959	Site of the former wall	34 Aldrich Road	9 March 2006
Sir Richard Doll	1912–2005	Epidemiologist	12 Rawlinson Road	7 June 2015
George Claridge Druce	1850–1932	Botanist, pharmacist, Mayor of Oxford	83 High Street	28 April 2018
Charles Elton; E. J. Scovell	1900–1991; 1907–1999	Ecologist; Poet	61 Park Town	8 June 2024
Sir Anthony Epstein	1921–2024	Virologist	19 West Street, Osney Island	2 November 2024
Daniel Evans; Joshua Symm	1769–1846; 1809–1887	Designers and builders of many Oxford buildings	34 St Giles'	19 October 2004
Baroness Lucy Faithfull	1910–1996	Social worker, champion of children’s rights	303 Woodstock Road	9 May 2026
Mabel Purefoy FitzGerald	1872–1973	Physiologist	12 Crick Road	14 October 2022
Philippa Foot	1920–2010	Moral philosopher	15 Walton Street	26 May 2023
Maureen Gardner	1928–1974	Olympic hurdles silver medallist 1948	17 Maidcroft Road, Cowley	7 July 2012
Olive Gibbs	1918–1995	Local politician and campaigner	Christ Church Old Buildings, Osney Lane	11 April 2015
Gathorne Robert Girdlestone	1881–1950	Pioneering orthopaedic surgeon	Nuffield Orthopaedic Centre Staff Accommodation, 72–74 Old Road, Headington, site of the Red House	9 May 2006
Sir Ludwig Guttmann	1899–1980	Neurosurgeon	63 Lonsdale Road, Summertown	29 April 2023
John Scott Haldane	1860–1936	Physiologist	11 Crick Road	2 May 2009
Norman Heatley	1911–2004	Biochemist	12 Oxford Road, Old Marston	17 July 2010
Dorothy Crowfoot Hodgkin	1910–1994	Crystallographer, Nobel Laureate	94 Woodstock Road	5 May 2016
Iffley Road Track	1954	The first sub-four-minute mile by Roger Bannister at Oxford University Sports Ground on 6 May 1954	Iffley Road	12 May 2004
Cecil Jackson-Cole	1901–1979	Entrepreneur, philanthropist and founding member of the Oxford Committee for Famine Relief (Oxfam)	17 Broad Street	14 November 2002
William Kimber	1872–1961	Headington Quarry morris dancer and musician	42 St Anne's Road, Headington	30 May 2011
Thomas Henry Kingerlee	1843–1928	Major Oxford builder	The River Hotel, 17 Botley Road	9 June 2021
Sir Leslie Kirkley	1911–1989	Humanitarian, Director of Oxfam	25 Capel Close, Summertown	16 June 2023
Sir Hans Krebs	1900–1981	Biochemist	27 Abberbury Road, Iffley	7 June 2008
Edmund Arnold Greening Lamborn	1877–1950	Headmaster, local historian, "man of letters", benefactor	34 Oxford Road, Littlemore	18 September 2010
James Legge	1815–1897	Sinologist and missionary	3 Keble Road	16 May 2018
C.S. Lewis	1898–1963	Academic and author	The Kilns, Lewis Close, Headington Quarry	26 July 2008
Dr Isabelle Little	1889–1969	Pioneering GP	2 Holywell Street	6 July 2024
Mary McMaster	1914–2004	Physiotherapist, founder of St Luke's Hospital and McMaster House	McMaster House, Latimer Road, Headington	27 July 2022
Salvador de Madariaga	1886–1978	Statesman, scholar and writer	Boxtrees, 3 St Andrew's Road, Headington	15 October 2011
Magnetic resonance imaging scanner	1980	Manufacture of the first commercial MRI whole-body scanner	The King's Centre, Osney Mead	14 May 2007
Percy Manning	1870–1917	Antiquary and folklorist	300 Banbury Road, Summertown	8 April 2017
Mary Sophia Merivale	1853–1928	First woman councillor in Oxford	7 Park Town	31 July 2026
Chassar Moir	1900–1977	Gynaecologist, pioneering researcher, and surgeon	11 Chadlington Road	6 July 2019
William Morfill	1834–1909	Linguist	42 Park Town	1 November 2009
William Morris, 1st Viscount Nuffield	1877–1963	Car maker and philanthropist	16 James Street	25 April 2004
Sir James Murray	1837–1915	Lexicographer	78 Banbury Road	21 October 2002
Dame Iris Murdoch	1919–1999	Novelist, moral philosopher	30 Charlbury Road	26 May 2023
Joan Murray née Clarke	1917–1996	Cryptanalyst and numismatist	7 Larkfields, Headington Quarry	27 July 2019
Paul Nash	1889–1946	Artist	106 Banbury Road	14 July 2007
Oxford Park & Ride	1973	First enduring Park & Ride bus scheme in the UK	Redbridge Park & Ride, Abingdon Road	1 November 2019
Oxford Playhouse	1923–1938	Original auditorium and former Big Game Museum	12 Woodstock Road	14 October 2010
Oxford United Football Club	1893	Foundation here as Headington F.C.	The Britannia, London Road, Headington	27 October 2019
Walter Pater; Clara Pater	1839–1894; 1841–1910	Author and scholar; Pioneer of women's education	2 Bradmore Road	3 July 2004
Penicillin	1938–1941	Development at Sir William Dunn School of Pathology	Sir William Dunn School of Pathology, South Parks Road	29 May 2018
Penicillin	1941	First treatment in 1941 at the former Radcliffe Infirmary Outpatients Building (now the University of Oxford Radcliffe Primary Care Health Sciences Building)	Radcliffe Observatory Quarter, Woodstock Road	29 May 2018
Dame Margery Perham	1895–1982	Historian, key writer and adviser on African affairs	5 Rawlinson Road	1 June 2019
Alec Peterson	1908–1988	Pioneer of international education	33 St Andrew's Road, Headington	26 September 2026
Sir Edward Poulton; Ronald Poulton (later Poulton Palmer)	1856–1943; 1889–1915	FRS, evolutionary biologist; Rugby football hero	Wykeham House, 56 Banbury Road	11 June 2016
Anne Ridler; Vivian Ridler	1912–2001; 1913–2009	Poet; Printer	14 Stanley Road	16 September 2016
Annie Rogers	1856–1937	Classicist, campaigner for women's full membership of Oxford University	35 St Giles'	23 September 2020
St Ignatius' Chapel	1793	First Roman Catholic church at Oxford after the Reformation	Angel Court, 81 St Clement's Street	31 July 2018
Sir Charles Sherrington	1857–1952	Neurophysiologist	9 Chadlington Road	28 April 2022
Sir Francis Simon	1893–1956	Physicist and philanthropist	10 Belbroughton Road	6 December 2003
Felicia Skene	1821–1899	Prison reformer	34 St Michael's Street	2 July 2002
Revd W. A. Spooner	1844–1930	Warden of New College, Oxford and eponymous word transposer	11 Keble Road	19 October 2024
Rev. Canon John Stansfeld	1854–1939	Priest and social reformer	Former St Ebbe's Rectory, Paradise Square	26 June 2009
Star Inn	1794	Formation of the Oxfordshire Yeomanry (later the Queen's Own Oxfordshire Hussars)	34 Cornmarket, now the Clarendon Centre	8 November 2003
Henry Taunt	1842–1922	Photographer	393 Cowley Road	10 January 2008
Nikolaas Tinbergen	1907–1988	Pioneering ethologist, Nobel Laureate	88 Lonsdale Road, Summertown	8 June 2022
J.R.R. Tolkien	1892–1973	Author and scholar	20 Northmoor Road	3 December 2002
Willam Turner of Oxford	1789–1862	Artist	16 St John Street	29 October 2002
Alan Villiers	1903–1982	Master of square-rigged ships, author, photographer	1A Lucerne Road, Summertown	6 May 2017
Mary Augusta Ward (Mrs Humphry Ward)	1851–1920	Social reformer and novelist	17 Bradmore Road	28 April 2012
William Wilkinson	1819–1901	Architect	5 Beaumont Street	19 October 2016
Ivy Williams	1877–1966	Lawyer and university teacher, first woman to be called to the Bar of England and Wales	12 King Edward Street	21 September 2020
Anthony Wood	1632–1695	Antiquarian	Postmasters' Hall, Merton Street	28 April 2008

== Blue plaques elsewhere in Oxfordshire ==
Blue plaques elsewhere in Oxfordshire
Name	Date(s)	Notable for	Address	Unveiling
Mont Abbott	1902–1989	Carter, shepherd, and storyteller	Biddy's Bottom, Fulwell	23 June 2007
Sir Patrick Abercrombie	1879–1957	Town Planner	Red House, Aston Upthorpe	15 July 2023
Ælfric Grammaticus	950 (circa)–1010	Scholar and teacher, first Abbot of Eynsham	Bartholomew Room, The Square, Eynsham	1 July 2022
John Alder	1715–1780	Lottery winner and public benefactor	The Mitre Inn, now 39 Stert Street, Abingdon-on-Thames	24 April 2003
H. H. Asquith	1852–1928	Prime Minister	43 Church Street, Sutton Courtenay	30 June 2012
Alice Maud Batt	1889–1969	VAD, Albert Medal holder	Batt House, 16 Market Square, Witney	1 October 2022
Thomas Beecham	1820–1907	Manufacturer of patent medicines	Beecham Cottage, Curbridge	21 May 2022
Lord Berners	1883–1950	Composer, writer, artist, and eccentric	Faringdon Folly Tower, Faringdon	6 April 2013
Sir John Betjeman	1906–1984	Poet, writer, and broadcaster	Garrards Farmhouse, Uffington	24 June 2006
Sir William Blackstone	1723–1780	Judge and jurist	The Town Hall, Wallingford	1 October 2009
Janet Heatley Blunt	1859–1950	Folk song and morris dance collector	Le Hall Place, Manor Road, Adderbury	27 September 2009
Henry Boddington	1813–1886	Founder of Boddington's Brewery	14 (54) Wellington Street (site of former workhouse), Thame	14 April 2011
Sir Muirhead Bone	1876–1953	Artist	Grayflete, Vernon Avenue, Harcourt Hill, North Hinksey	20 September 2025
Edmund Bradstock	1550–1607	Benefactor to Appleford-on-Thames and Sutton Courtenay	Orchard House, Church Street, Appleford-on-Thames	3 June 2017
William Buckland	1784–1856	Geologist	The Old Rectory, Islip	10 August 2008
Alfredo Campoli	1906–1991	Violinist	39 North Street, Thame	14 April 2011
William Carter	1852–1921	Founder of Carterton	Carterton Town Hall, Carterton	30 March 2004
Robin Cavendish	1930–1994	Responaut, champion of the severely disabled	The Old Rectory, Church Lane, Drayton St Leonard	16 June 2019
Agatha Christie; Max Mallowan	1890–1976; 1904–1978	Author; Archaeologist	Winterbrook House, Cholsey	8 May 2010
The Countryman; J. W. Robertson Scott	1947–2003; 1866–1962	Magazine at Burford; Founding editor	Greyhounds, Ship Street, Burford	22 June 2014
Sir Stafford Cripps	1889–1952	Politician and benefactor	The Village Centre, Filkins	7 July 2007
Wytton Perowne D'Arcy Dalton	1893–1981	Champion and protector of Public Rights of Way	The Limes (formerly Wyverns), Lower End, Great Milton	18 August 2017
General Sir Kenneth Darling	1909–1998	Soldier and General	Vicarage Farmhouse, Alchester Road, Chesterton	4 July 2015
William Henry Dines	1855–1927	Pioneering meteorologist	The Old Barn, Brook Street, Benson	9 June 2018
Charles Early	1824–1912	Blanket manufacturer	Witney Mill, Mill Street, Witney	24 April 2009
Frederick Etchells	1886–1973	Artist, architect, writer	The Thatched Cottage, West Challow	20 July 2024
Raymond ffennell	1871–1944	Philanthropist (with his wife Hope and daughter Hazel)	Hill End Centre, Farmoor	20 August 2016
James Figg	1684–1734	Prize fighter	James Figg pub (formerly the Greyhound Inn), Cornmarket, Thame	14 April 2011
Sir Terry Frost	1915–2003	Abstract artist	2 Old Parr Street, Banbury	15 July 2017
Humphrey Gainsborough	1718–1776	Innovative engineer	Christ Church United Reformed Church, Reading Road, Henley-on-Thames	1 September 2002
The Revd Dr John Allen Giles	1808–1884	Scholar, writer, local historian	Cobb House, Church Close, Bampton	11 July 2026
Elizabeth Goudge	1900–1984	Artist	Rose Cottage, Rotherfield Peppard	19 April 2008
Kenneth Grahame	1859–1932	Author	Boham's House, Westbrook Street, Blewbury	25 May 2012
Robert Graves	1895–1985	Poet and writer	World's End, Collice Street, Islip	18 May 2014
Roy Jenkins, Baron Jenkins of Hillhead; Dame Jennifer Jenkins	1920–2003; 1921–2017	Politician and author; Conservationist and public servant	St Amand's House, Church Street, East Hendred	16 September 2023
Larcum Kendall	1721–1795	Watchmaker	The Post Office (near site of cottage), 8 Market Street, Charlbury	3 May 2014
John Kibble	1865–1951	Antiquarian and stonemason	Stratford House, Well Hill, Finstock	5 July 2025
Cecil Kimber	1888–1845	Creator of the MG marque	Boundary House, Oxford Road, Abingdon-on-Thames	4 October 2014
Frank Howard Kirby	1871–1956	Royal Engineers and RAF	Wavertree, 18 Lower High Street, Thame	10 September 2021
Samuel Knibb; Joseph Knibb; John Knibb	1625–c.1670; 1640–1711; 1650–1722	Eminent clockmakers	The Church Room, Claydon	25 September 2010
F. W. T. C. Lascelles	1875–1934	Pageant master	The Manor, Sibford Gower	24 October 2003
William Logsdail	1859–1944	Artist	The Manor House, Noke	13 July 2013
Herbert Payne	1880–1922	Campaigner for first council housing in Banbury	71 Queens Road, Banbury	17 May 2025
William Penney, Baron Penney	1909–1991	Mathematical physicist and public servant	Orchard House, Cat Street, East Hendred	8 August 2014
William Potts	1868–1949	Author and editor of the Banbury Guardian	Former printing works, 16 Parson Street, Banbury	30 April 2002
Arthur Edwin Preston	1852–1942	Mayor, antiquarian, and historian of Abingdon	Whitefield, Park Crescent, Abingdon-on-Thames	12 June 2015
Barbara Pym	1913–1980	Novelist	Barn Cottage, Finstock	1 September 2006
Ripon Hall, Oxford	1933–1975	Former Church of England Theological College	Foxcome Hall, Boars Hill	27 May 2004
Francis Edward Robinson	1833–1910	Clergyman and doyen of bell ringers	St Peter's Church, Drayton, Abingdon-on-Thames	22 May 2016
L. T. C. Rolt	1910–1974	Engineering historian, champion of Inland Waterways	Tooley's Boatyard, Banbury	7 August 2010
Sir Bernhard Samuelson	1820–1905	Industrialist and educationist	Mechanics Institute, now Banbury Library, Marlborough Road, Banbury	30 April 2002
Samuel Edgar Saunders	1857–1933	Boat builder and engineer, pioneer of air and marine craft	Former boathouse and showroom by bridge, Goring-on-Thames	7 September 2013
Freydis Sharland	1920–2014	‘Spitfire Girl’, Air Transport Auxiliary	Chalkstone Cottage, 40 Brook Street, Benson, Oxfordshire	18 May 2024
James Allen Shuffrey	1859–1939	Artist	7 Narrow Hill, Woodgreen, Witney	17 May 2008
John Henry Smythe	1915–1996	Barrister Sr Officer HMT Empire Windrush, Attorney General, Sierra Leone	1 Garden City, Thame	26 July 2025
Patrick Steptoe	1913–1988	Gynaecologist, pioneer of IVF	52 West End, Witney	5 May 2019
Revd Edward Stone	1702–1768	Discoverer of aspirin	Hitchman's Brewery, Chipping Norton	1 October 2003
Sir Montagu Stopford	1892–1971	Burma Campaign	Rock Hill, Chipping Norton	8 July 2008
Dylan Thomas	1914–1953	Poet and writer	The Manor House, South Leigh	7 June 2025
Reginald Tiddy	1880–1916	Collector of folk plays and local benefactor	Tiddy Hall, Ascott-under-Wychwood	8 September 2012
Jethro Tull	1674–1741	Inventor of the seed drill	19A The Street, Crowmarsh Gifford	17 September 2002
Daniel Turner	1710–1798	Baptist minister, theologian, hymn writer	35 Ock Street, Abingdon-on-Thames	17 July 2011
Westfield House	1937–1939	Refuge for Basque Children	Bampton Road, Aston	17 July 2003
Alfred White	1804–1876	Innkeeper, church bellhanger, founder of Whites of Appleton	The Greyhound, Besselsleigh	26 July 2014
Wytham Woods	1942	Bequest	Keeper's Hill Car Park, Wytham	7 October 2017
