= F. Hugh Vallancey =

Francis Hugh Vallancey
- Born: F. Hugh Vallancey; 1879
- Died: 1950 (aged 70–71)
- Occupation: Philatelist

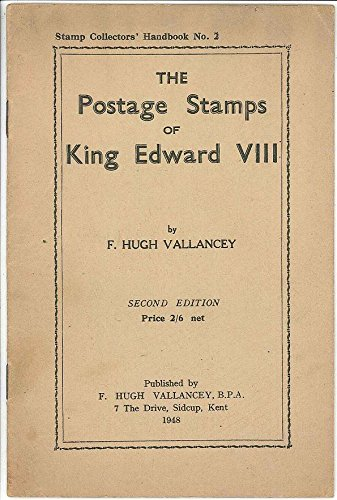
The postage stamps of King Edward VIII, 2nd edition, 1948.

Francis Hugh Vallancey (1879 – 6 September 1950) was a schoolmaster, philatelist, philatelic author and editor, and dealer in philatelic literature. His business was destroyed during the London Blitz of 1941, but he rebuilt it after the war before ill health forced his retirement.

== Early life and family ==
Francis Hugh Vallancey was born in Cranfield, Bedfordshire, England in1879. He was a schoolmaster and served in the Boer War. He married Constance Margaret Powell and had a daughter.

== Philately ==
Vallancey was active in philately for 50 years. In 1912, he founded the London Philatelic Club with F.A. Wickhart and in January 1915, he acquired the magazine Stamp Collecting of which he became the editor until it was taken over by Douglas B. Armstrong's Stamp Collecting Limited in 1930. He was one of the first philatelists to take a serious interest in perfins (stamps perforated with firms' initials), about which he published a book in 1933.

He was one of the principal dealers in philatelic literature in Britain and acquired the stock of philatelic publishers Harris Publications after A.H. Harris's death, and the library of Frank A. Bellamy which Vallancey estimated to contain over 200,000 items, though he described much of it as "waste paper". He bought Edward Denny Bacon's library after Bacon's death in 1938. It was transferred to the basement of Vallancey's "Philately House" premises in St Bride Street, London, where it was catalogued by L.N. Williams and began to be sold off. On 10 May 1941, however, a German bomb completely destroyed Philately House, taking Vallancey's business and the remains of the Bacon library with it. Not long afterwards, in 1942, Vallancey sold his collection of British stamps by auction through Robson Lowe in a sale comprising 744 lots.

After the war, Vallancey reestablished his business, working from home, but retired in 1948 due to ill health, selling his magazine stock to H. Garratt-Adams and the remainder, mainly books, to Ramsay Stewart (1931–66).

== Death and legacy ==
Vallancey died on 6 September 1950 in Bromley, Kent, England. He was survived by his wife and daughter. His publishing interests were taken over by Tom Todd (1911–84) as Vallancey International. His literature stock passed through several hands and were estimated by Harry Hayes in 1980 to still be many tons, principally deriving from the Harris and Bellamy purchases.

== Selected publications ==
- The postage stamps of Great Britain 1840-1922. Stamp Collecting, London, 1923. (With Sidney A.R. Oliver)
- A guide to philatelic literature. Vallancey Press, London, 1927-29. (compiler)
- British stamps perforated with firms' initials. Vallancey Press, London, 1933. (2nd 1948)
- British postmarks with special reference to the 1844 and subsequent numbered obliterations. Vallancey Press, London, 1935.
- Check list of British photogravure stamps of King George V, including stamps overprinted for Morocco. Vallancey Press, London, 1939.
- The postage stamps of King Edward VIII. 2nd. F. Hugh Vallancey, Sidcup, 1948.
- The A.M.G. (Allied Military Government) stamps of Germany. Herman Herst, Shrub Oak, NY, 1958.
