= John Knibb =

- Born: 21 January 1650; 1650; Claydon, Oxfordshire
- Died: 18 July 1722 (aged 72); Oxford
- Occupations: Clock- and watchmaker

John Knibb (1650–1722) was an English clockmaker born in Claydon, Oxfordshire. He produced various clocks and watches including bracket clocks, lantern clocks, longcase clocks, and some wall-clocks, as well as building and maintaining several turret clocks. Even though his main market was catering to customers of modest means, he also dominated the higher-quality sector. Only six of Knibb's watches are known to survive.

== Life ==
Knibb was born in 1650, the sixth son of Thomas and Elizabeth Knibb of Claydon, Oxfordshire. He was cousin to the clock- and instrument maker Samuel Knibb (1625–70) and younger brother of the distinguished clock- and watchmaker Joseph Knibb (1640–1711).

In about 1664 Knibb moved from Claydon to Oxford to join his elder brother as either an apprentice or an assistant. In 1670, Samuel Knibb died and Joseph moved to London to replace him, leaving John in charge in Oxford. However, John was not a freeman of the City of Oxford, so all the clocks that he made still had to be signed "Joseph Knibb".

In 1672, Knibb applied to become a freeman of Oxford, and the Mayor and City Council proposed that he should be admitted for a fee of £30. Knibb considered this excessive, so he asked Brome Whorwood, one of the two MPs for Oxford, to intervene. Under Whorwood's persuasion, the Council reduced the fee to 20 marks (£13 6s 8d) and admitted Knibb as a freeman in April 1673.

Knibb and his wife Elizabeth had three sons and five daughters between 1679 and 1695. Four of their daughters predeceased them. Knibb died at Oxford in 1722, followed by his widow Elizabeth in 1726. They are buried at St Cross parish church with their four daughters.

John and Elizabeth were survived by their one remaining daughter and three sons, of whom the youngest, Joseph (born 1695), had been apprenticed to a London clockmaker in 1710. Knibb left young Joseph only one shilling in his will, because he had already inherited a legacy of £200 from his uncle Joseph, who died in 1711.

Knibb had several apprentices during his career. One was Samuel Aldworth, from Childrey, who was apprenticed to Knibb in 1673 and became a freeman of the city with his own clock business in 1689. In 1697 Joseph Knibb retired from London to Hanslope and Aldworth moved to London to succeed him. In 1703, Aldworth married into the Knibb extended family, his bride being Elizabeth Knibb, from Collingtree in Northamptonshire.

== Oxford clockmaking in Knibb's time ==
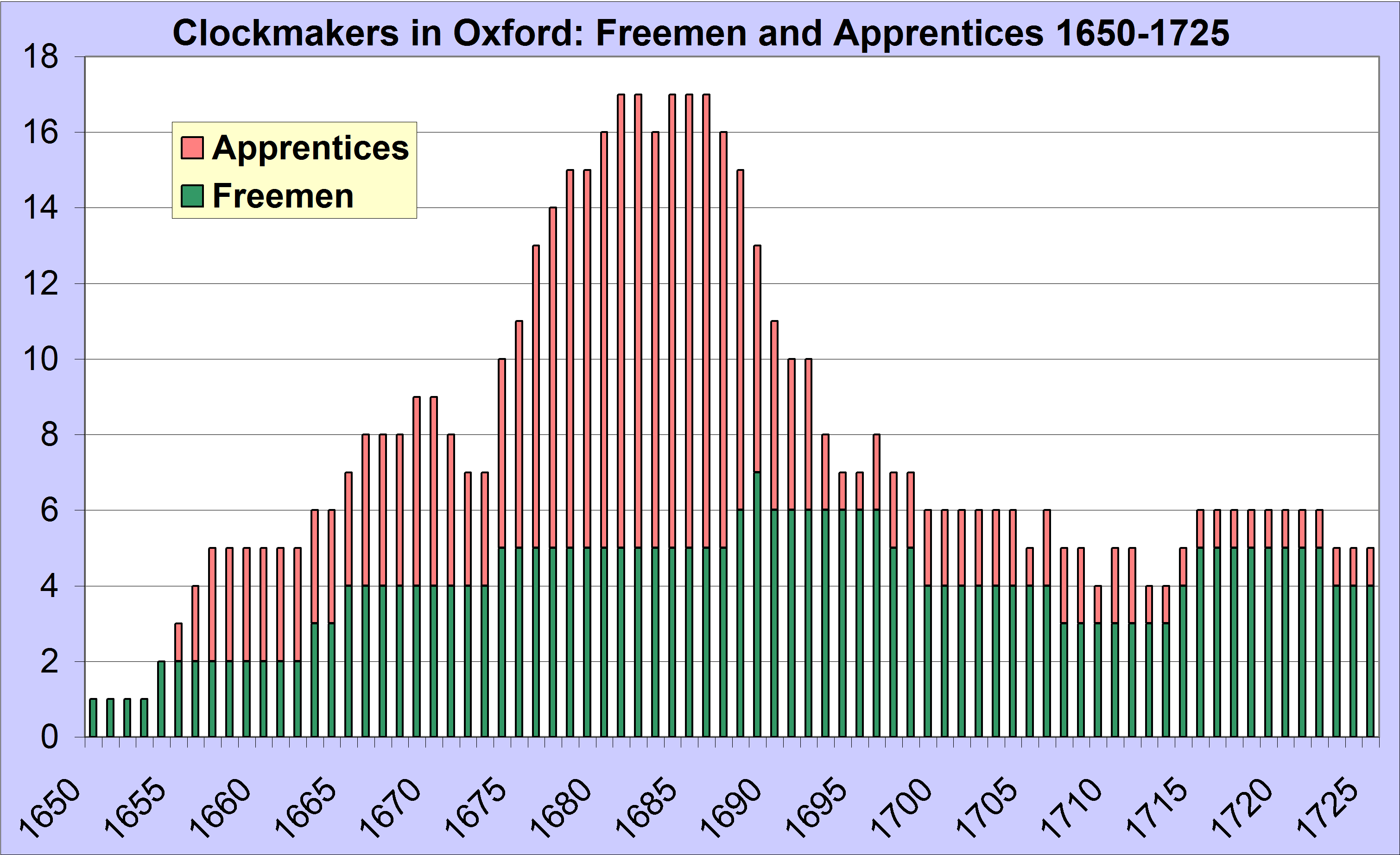
Numbers of freemen clockmakers (green) and their apprentices (red) in Oxford, 1650–1725

Knibb worked in Oxford at a time when clockmaking suddenly flourished in the city. During the Commonwealth of England Oxford had only two or three clockmakers and at times none of them had an apprentice. However, after the restoration of the Stuart monarchy Oxford's number of clockmakers' apprentices increased to five in 1670 and 12 for much of the 1680s. The number of qualified clockmakers with freedom of the city increased more slowly, peaking at seven early in the 1690s.

In the late 1680s and early 1690s apprentices were not replaced after they completed their seven years of training. The number of apprentices fell rapidly, and from the mid-1690s until the mid-1720s there were only ever one or two in the whole of Oxford. This was largely because the market was now fully supplied, sustaining between three and five freemen clockmakers for the corresponding three decades.

Knibb himself took a succession of 10 apprentices between 1673 and 1722. Between 1681 and 1688 he seems to have had three apprentices at the same time, as well as Aldworth as his journeyman.

== Work ==
In this busy period for clockmaking John Knibb was preeminent. When Joseph moved to London in 1670, John took more responsibility for the business in Oxford. The premises that Knibb took over from his brother were a tenement on the south side of Holywell Street leased from Merton College, Oxford, built in the shadow of the city walls on what had been the town ditch.

Knibb produced bracket clocks, lantern clocks, longcase clocks, and wall clocks. His products were more numerous than his Oxford competitors. He catered for the less expensive segment of the market but he also dominated the higher quality part of the market.

Knibb built and maintained turret clocks. From 1673 until his death in 1722, he maintained the turret clock at Wadham College, Oxford that was probably made by his brother Joseph. He built the turret clock for St John's College, Oxford in 1690 and repaired the clock at St Bartholomew's parish church, Yarnton in 1703.

Six of Knibb's watches are known to survive. One verge watch made in about 1690 is in the Clockmakers' Museum at the Guildhall, London. The Museum of the History of Science, Oxford has three that were also made in about 1690. The collection at Oxford includes one of Knibb's bracket clocks, two of his longcase clocks and one of his wall clocks.

After his brother Joseph died in 1711, his will proved in 1712 bequeathed his 230-acre (93 ha) farm at Hanslope to Knibb. However, only one clock is known with the inscription "John Knibb Hanslap", so it appears that Knibb continued to work almost exclusively in Oxford.

== Civic and social life ==
In 1686, Knibb was appointed a member of Oxford City Council. He was elected as one of the Bailiffs in 1688 and from 1690 to 1696. He was elected as one of the Mayor's assistants in 1697, and Keykeeper and assistant member of the Mayor's council in 1700. Knibb was elected Mayor of Oxford twice, in 1698 and 1710. In 1716, he was elected Alderman.

Knibb's friends included the antiquarians Anthony Wood and Thomas Hearne. In 1716, Hearne wrote "This Nibb is a man of so little understanding that he was never known to laugh". However, on learning of Knibb's death in 1722 Hearne wrote that Knibb was "an old, quiet, harmless Man abt. 4 score years of Age."

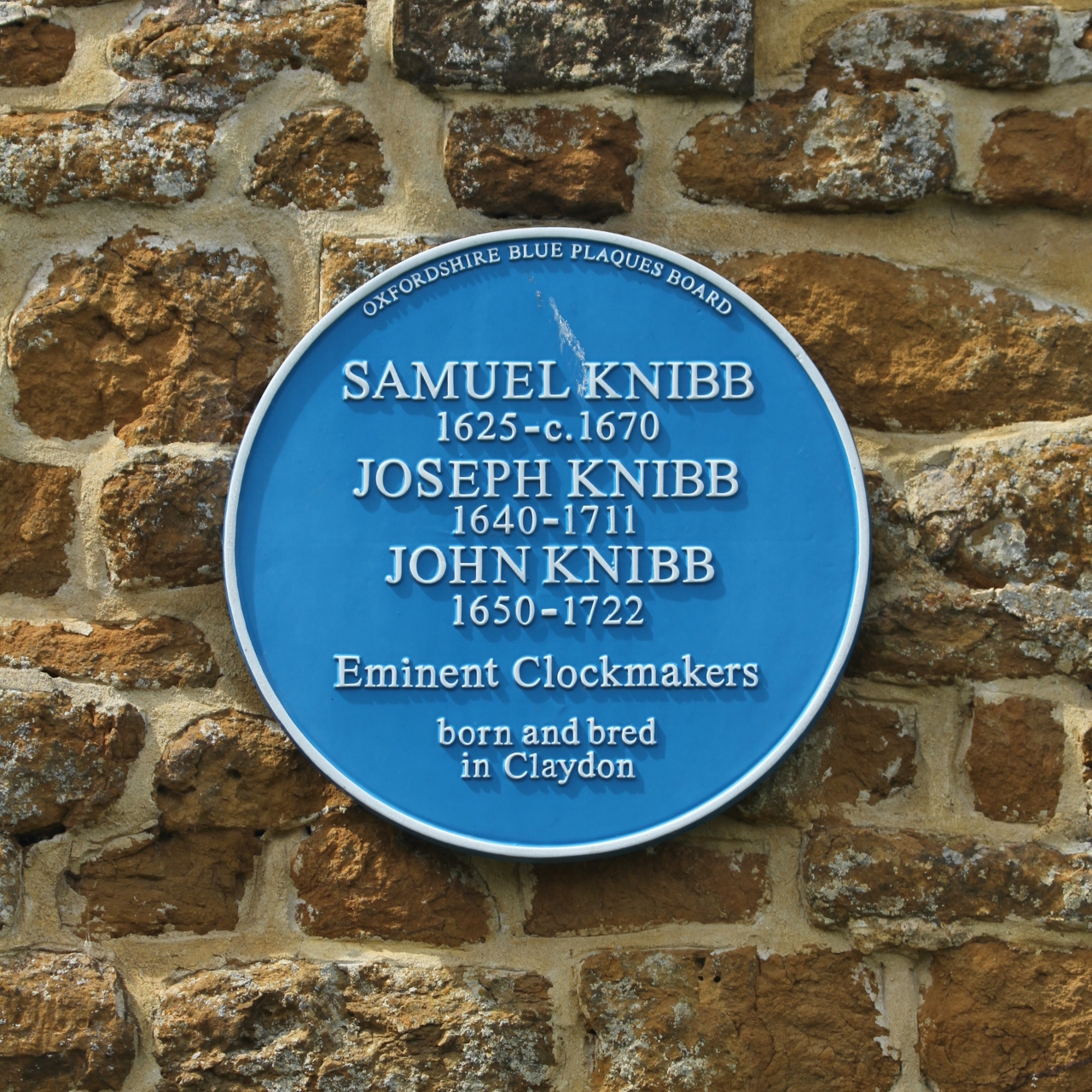
Oxfordshire Blue Plaque in Claydon commemorating Samuel, Joseph and John Knibb

== Blue plaque ==
On 26 September 2010 the Oxfordshire Blue Plaques Board unveiled a blue plaque at Claydon to Samuel, Joseph and John Knibb.

== Sources and further reading ==
- Beeson, CFC (1989) [1962]. Simcock, AV (ed.). Clockmaking in Oxfordshire 1400–1850 (3rd ed.). Oxford: Museum of the History of Science. pp. 117–122. ISBN 0-903364-06-9.
- Cescinsky, Herbert (1938). Old English Master Clockmakers and Their Clocks 1670 to 1820. London: George Routledge and Co.
- Dawson, Percy G; Drover, CB; Parkes, DW (1994) [1982]. Early English Clocks – A Discussion of Domestic Clocks up to the Beginning of the Eighteenth Century. Woodbridge: The Antique Collectors' Club.
- Lee, RA (1964). The Knibb Family, Clockmakers Or: Automatopaei Knibb Familiaei. The Manor House Press.
- Loomes, Brian (1999) [1982]. The Early Clockmakers of Great Britain. Tonbridge: Robert Hale Ltd. ISBN 0719802008.
- Ullyett, Kenneth (1950). In Quest of Clocks. London: Rockliff Publishing Corporation Ltd. pp. 131–134.
