= H. Garratt-Adams =

British philatelist

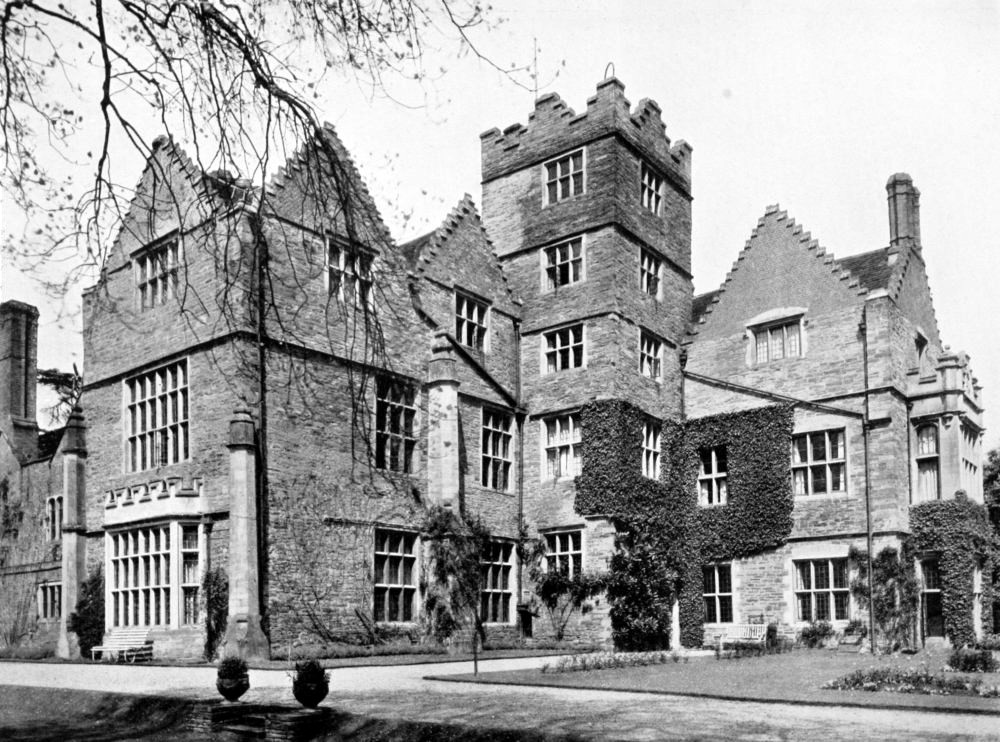
Kinnersley Castle, Garratt-Adams' home and the location of his hoard of philatelic literature.

Henry Garratt-Adams (13 April 1916 – 6 September 1992) was a British philatelist, philatelic publisher and dealer in philatelic literature based in Kinnersley Castle in Herefordshire, England. After his death, a large hoard of philatelic literature was found at the castle that included many rare items dating to the earliest days of philately.

== Early life and family ==
Henry Garratt-Adams was born on 13 April 1916.

He married Tonks-D'Esmonde and they had a daughter Anne K. Garratt-Adams in 1944.

He bought Kinnersley Castle in 1954.

== Philatelic career ==
Part of the H. Garratt-Adams philatelic literature hoard in the cellar of Kinnersley Castle.

Garratt-Adams was a philatelist, philatelic publisher and dealer in philatelic literature. After F. Hugh Vallancey's retirement in 1948, Garratt-Adams bought Vallancey's magazine stock and in 1955, he bought the Albert Harris library and stock for about £5,000 which included material that Harris had bought from Frank Bellamy and Edward Denny Bacon.

He published a number of philatelic works as well as starting a magazine, The Philatelic Guide, which lasted only two issues. He was also the editor of The Philatelic Journal of Great Britain and co-wrote a book on Mexican philately with H.T. Wilson.

Around 1960, Garratt-Adams, apparently having spent most of his money on philately, was forced to let Kinnersley Castle to an old people's home while he moved into the castle's tower rooms. Described by Robert Danzig as disorganised and eccentric, Garratt-Adams' huge collection of philatelic magazines, auction catalogues and other literature was then dispersed around unused parts of the castle, including the barn and cellar where they lay largely undisturbed until their inspection by the dealer Robert Danzig in 1993 after Garratt-Adams' death.

Among the material found by Danzig was around 1,000 items mentioned in the catalogue of the Earl of Crawford's library, regarded as one of the most complete early philatelic libraries ever formed, and a number of items that even Crawford did not own such as an early edition of the Russian magazine Echo Timbrophile. Garratt-Adams also owned the first edition of The Stamp-Collector's Review and Monthly Advertiser from December 1862 and a complete bound set of the Journal of the Philatelic Literature Society.

As a collector, Garratt-Adams specialised in the stamps of Nepal, Tibet, India and the Indian States about which he contributed articles to the Philatelic Journal of Great Britain.

== Death and legacy ==
Garratt-Adams died on 6 September 1992, leaving an estate of £606,712. His Indian States stamps were sold at auction by Christie's in early 1993 and his Nepal and Tibet stamps by Christie's Robson Lowe in April 1993. His philatelic library was sold separately in three auction sales by Huys-Berlingin of Triesen, Liechtenstein, and one by Schwanke & Sohn of Hamburg, Germany, amounting to around 10,000 lots in total.

== Selected publications ==
- "War-Time Issues of Nepal, 1941–1946", The Philatelic Journal of Great Britain, July–September 1947, pp. 57–60.
- "Duttia, An Issue of 50 Years Ago Discovered", The Philatelic Journal of Great Britain, April–June 1950, pp. 28–32.
- "Duttia, Some further notes on the issue recently discovered", The Philatelic Journal of Great Britain, Vol. 60, October–December 1950, pp. 78-?.
- A Short History and Guide to Kinnersley Castle, Herefordshire. Kinnersley, 1989. (Revised edition 2004)
