= Childrey =

Village in Oxfordshire, England

Coordinates: 51.593°N 1.453°W

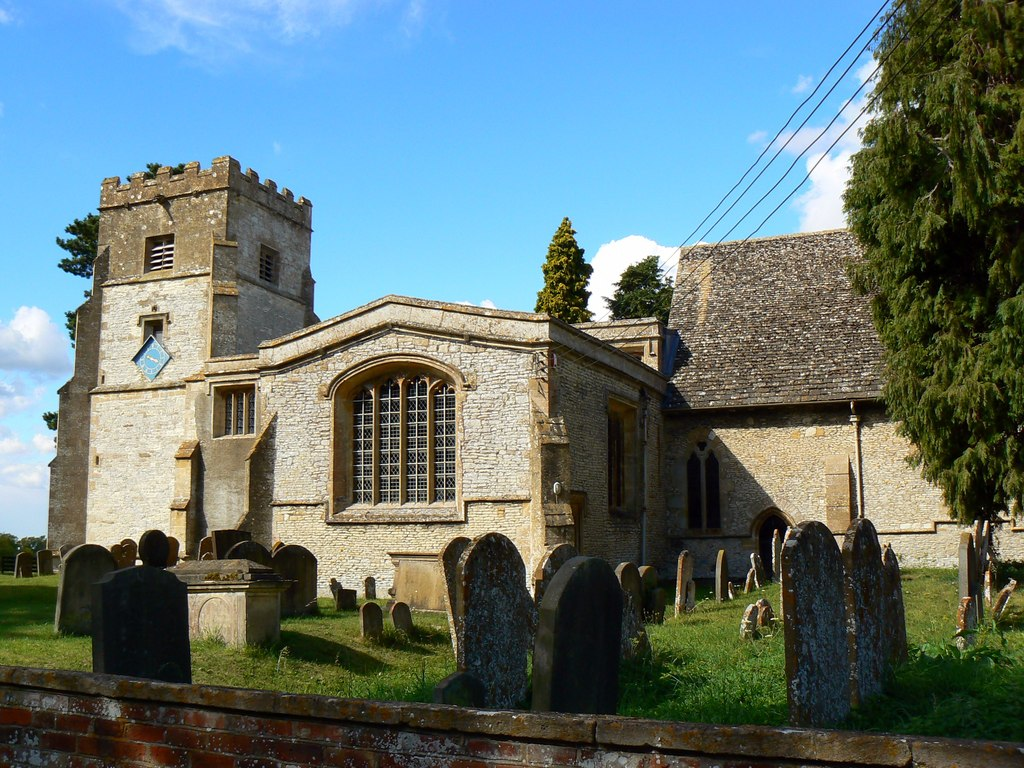
- Parish church of St Mary the Virgin

- Location within Oxfordshire
- Population: 527 (2021 Census)
- OS grid reference: SU3687
- Civil parish: Childrey
- District: Vale of White Horse
- Shire county: Oxfordshire
- Region: South East
- Country: England
- Sovereign state: United Kingdom
- Post town: Wantage
- Postcode district: OX12
- Dialling code: 01235
- Police: Thames Valley
- Fire: Oxfordshire
- Ambulance: South Central
- UK Parliament: Didcot and Wantage
- Website: Childrey

Childrey is a village and civil parish about 2 1/2 miles (4 km) west of Wantage in the Vale of White Horse. The parish was part of the Wantage Rural District in Berkshire until the 1974 boundary changes transferred the Vale of White Horse to Oxfordshire. The 2021 Census recorded the parish population as 527.

== Geography ==
Childrey is a spring line settlement on the escarpment of the Berkshire Downs. The parish measures just over 5 1/2 miles (9 km) north – south but less than 1 1/2 miles (2.4 km) east – west at its widest point. Its highest point is a chalk hill on The Ridgeway about 2 miles (3 km) south of the village, which is at least 750 feet (230 m) high. In 1924 the parish covered an area of just over 2,700 acres (1,100 ha). Childrey village is on the B4001 road, which joins the A417 road about 2 miles (3 km) to the north. The B4507 road passes east – west through the parish just south of the village, and forms a crossroads with the B4001.

== Archaeology ==
On the Berkshire Downs about 1 1/2 miles (2.4 km) south of the village are two Bronze Age bowl barrows. One is west of Hackpen Hill. It is 90 feet (27 m) in diameter and 4 feet (1.2 m) high. In the 19th century it was excavated and one cremation was found. The other barrow is just west of the B4001 road and about 1/2 mile (800 m) west of Hackpen Hill barrow. It is about 75 feet (23 m) in diameter and up to 3 feet 3 inches (1 m) high. Each barrow is a Scheduled Ancient Monument.

The Thames Water company workers and experts from Cotswold Archeology discovered 26 skeletons belong to Iron Age from graves found in Childrey in 2019. The site called Childrey Warren dates back to the Iron Age of England and is about 3,000 years old. According to CNN, Cotswold archaeologists have found a woman skeleton with her feet cut off and her arms attached behind her back. Based on the remains, it is believed that these people may have been the victims of human sacrifice. “The discovery challenges our perceptions about the past, and invites us to try to understand the beliefs of people who lived and died more than 2,000 years ago,” Neil Holbrook, head executive of Cotswold Archaeology stated about Childrey graves.

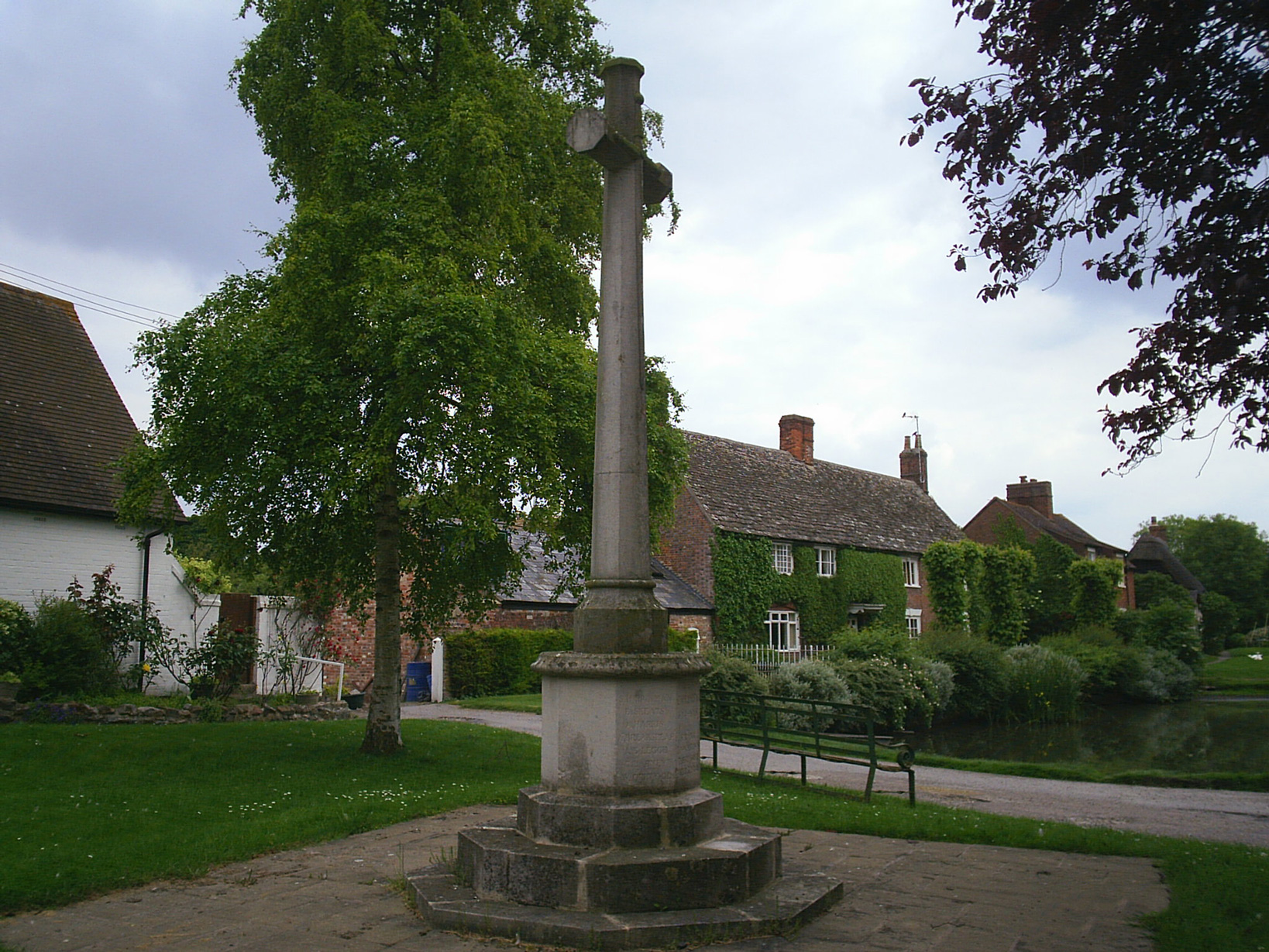
Childrey War Memorial

== Toponyms ==
The earliest known records of Childrey Brook are as Cillarīþ in Anglo-Saxon charters from 940 and 944, now reproduced in the Cartularium Saxonicum. The name is derived from the Old English Cillan-rīþ or Cilloan-rīþ, meaning "Cilla's stream". This became the toponym for the manor and village, which an Anglo-Saxon will from 950 records as Cillariðe. The Domesday Book of 1086 and an entry for 1220 in the Book of Fees record it as Celrea. Its spelling evolved through Chilree in the 13th century and Chelrey in the 13th to 15th centuries before reaching its current form. About 1 1/2 miles (2.4 km) southwest of the village is Hackpen Hill. There are hills of the same name in Dorset and Wiltshire. The name may be derived from the Old English haca meaning "hook" and Old Welsh pen meaning "hill".

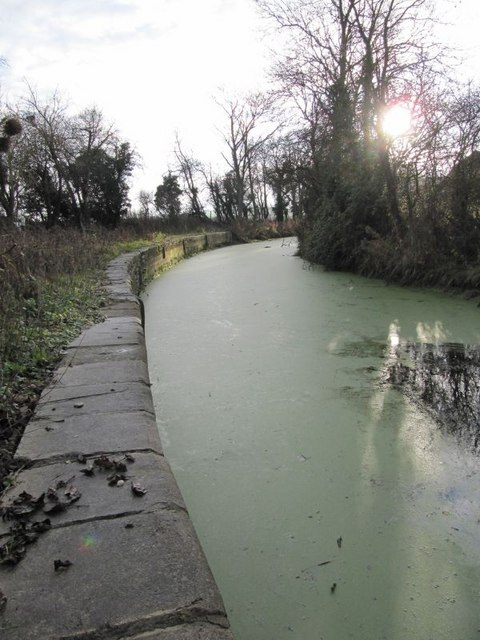
Childrey Wharf on the Wilts & Berks Canal

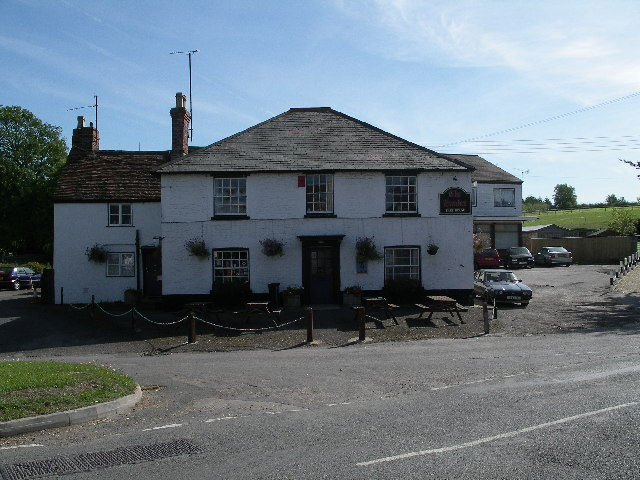
The Hatchet, which was a pub until 2016

== Manors ==
=== Frethornes ===
Before the Norman Conquest of England the manor of Frethornes was held by an Anglo-Saxon freeman called Brictric. The Domesday Book records that by 1086 it was held by a Norman, Turstin FitzRou. The manor's name comes from the de Frethorne family, who were tenants of the manor by 1166 and remained so until 1357. In 1514, the manor was recorded as being held by Baron FitzWarin and his heirs, who held the manor of Wantage. An annual payment of four bushels and two pecks of wheat from Frethornes to the manor of Wantage was still payable in 1771.

=== Mautravers ===
The manor of Mautravers was held by an Anglo-Saxon freeman called Edmund before the Conquest, and afterwards by Roger de Lacy. The manor got its name from several generations of lord of the manor who were all called John Mautravers or Maltravers, and who held it from the late 12th to the late 14th centuries. The earliest known John Mautravers held the manor by 1194 and died in 1201. A later John Mautravers supported Roger Mortimer de Chirk in his rebellion against Edward II in 1321–22. The rebellion was defeated and Mautravers' lands, including his manor at Childrey, were seized. They were restored to him in 1327 and he was summoned to Parliament as Baron Maltravers in 1330. However, in March of that year he was involved in the execution of Edmund of Woodstock, 1st Earl of Kent, for which he forfeited his estates again. This time Maltravers was condemned to death but he escaped to mainland Europe.

In Maltravers' absence Childrey was granted to John de Nevill of Hornby. De Nevill died heirless and Childrey was in 1336 granted to John de Ufford, but he too died without an heir. In 1348 Childrey was granted to Agnes, wife of John Maltravers, and he was again restored to all his estates in 1352. After Maltravers died in 1364, Agnes devoted the manor to the support of three chaplains at a chantry at the parish church of St Mary the Virgin, Lytchett Matravers, Dorset. In 1371 the three chaplains granted the manor to the vicar of Lytchett Matravers, and his successors retained the manor until Edward VI's abolition of chantries in 1547.

=== Rampayns ===
The Domesday Book records that in 1086 one William Leuric held the manor of Rampayns, which consisted of 12 hides. His lands passed to the Scroop family. The manor's name comes from the de Rampayn family, who held it from about 1230 to 1329. It then passed through the Achard, Lynt, Walrond, Kentwood and Waryng families. Elizabeth, daughter of Thomas Waryng married her second husband William Fettiplace, with whose descendants the manor then remained until the 19th century. John Fettiplace inherited the manor in 1657 and after the restoration of the English Monarchy was created Sir John Fettiplace, 1st Baronet, of Childrey.

The baronetcy became extinct on the death of Sir George Fettiplace, 5th Baronet in 1743, whereupon the manor passed to his sister Diana. She was married to John Bushel of Cleeve Prior, Worcestershire, but their son Thomas took the surname Fettiplace. His son Charles died in 1805 leaving the manor to his nephew Richard Gorges. He too took the surname Fettiplace but he died the following year, leaving the manor to his sister. The manor then passed through the families of Dacre, Farmer and Schoolcroft Burton, and in 1924 was owned by a Mr Dunn.

== Churches ==
=== Church of England ===
The Church of England parish church of Saint Mary the Virgin was originally late Norman, built either late in the 12th century or early in the 13th, but the only surviving original features are the south doorway and the font. The chancel was rebuilt late in the 13th century. The north and south transepts were added in the 14th century, the Perpendicular Gothic west tower in the 15th and the south porch in the 16th century. One window and a tomb recess are surviving original Decorated Gothic features of one of the transepts, but both transepts now have Perpendicular windows that were inserted later. The tomb recess in the north transept contains a fine effigy of a knight. The south transept is the larger of the two and is the family Fettiplace chapel. St Mary's is notable for its numerous monumental brasses, including one to William Fynderne (died 1444) and his wife which at 52 inches (1.3 m) long is the largest in old Berkshire.

The church is a Grade I listed building. The west tower has a ring of eight bells. Until the 21st century it was a ring of six. Ellis I Knight of Reading, Berkshire cast the tenor bell in 1632 and the fourth and fifth bells in 1639. Pack and Chapman of the Whitechapel Bell Foundry cast the second bell in 1770. George Mears & Co of the same foundry cast the treble bell in 1865, and Mears and Stainbank of Whitechapel recast the third bell in 1907. Then in 2005 the 1865 treble bell was removed and the Whitechapel foundry cast a new treble, second and third bells to increase the ring to eight. St Mary's parish is part of the Ridgeway Benefice, along with the parishes of Kingston Lisle, Letcombe Bassett, Letcombe Regis, Sparsholt and West Challow.

The first Cedars of Lebanon in Britain were introduced by Edward Pococke, who collected seed in 1638–39 while based in Syria as chaplain to the Turkey Company; on his return to Britain, he was given the living of Childrey; a tree he planted at the Rectory there in 1646 is the oldest surviving specimen in Britain.

=== Methodist ===
Childrey Methodist church opened in 1849 as a Wesleyan chapel. There was a separate Primitive Methodist chapel until the Methodist Union in 1932. The front of the chapel building collapsed in 1986. A new building was opened in 1994.

== Economic and social history ==
=== Clockmaker ===
Samuel Aldworth, a yeoman of Childrey, was apprenticed to the notable clockmaker John Knibb of Oxford in 1673. After his seven-year apprenticeship he remained in his master's service until 1689, when he was made a freeman of the City of Oxford and established his own clockmaking business in the city. In 1697 Knibb's elder brother, the distinguished clock and watchmaker Joseph Knibb, sold his business in London and retired to Hanslope in Buckinghamshire. Aldworth moved to London in his place and became a brother of the Worshipful Company of Clockmakers. In 1703 Aldworth was granted a licence to marry Elizabeth Knibb of Collingtree, Northamptonshire. In later life Aldworth retired to Childrey, where he continued his work. One longcase clock dated 1725 is signed Sam Aldworth at Childrey From London. Aldworth died in about 1730.

=== Canal ===
Between 1805 and 1807 the section of the Wilts & Berks Canal between Longcot and Challow was completed. It passes through the parish about 1/3 mile (540 m) north of the village. Childrey had a wharf on the canal, about 3/4 mile (1.2 km) north of the village. Traffic on the canal had virtually ceased by 1901 and the route was formally abandoned in 1914. The Wilts & Berks Canal Trust is currently restoring the canal.

=== Railway ===
The Great Western Main Line through the Vale of White Horse was opened in 1840. It passes through the northern extremity of Childrey parish, just under 2 miles (3 km) north of the village. Challow railway station was just outside the parish, about on the main road linking Faringdon and Wantage about 2 miles (3 km) north of Childrey village. The Great Western Railway opened the station in 1840 and British Railways closed it in 1964.

== Amenities ==
Childrey village hall opened in 1896. There is a village pond. It has existed for centuries and was used for watering livestock. Ridgeway C of E primary school is in Childrey. It was opened in 1913 as the parish school for Childrey. In 1998 it merged with the school in nearby Letcombe Regis and adopted its current name. The buildings were extended in 2000. Childrey has a playing field with a football pitch, a playground and a pavilion with changing facilities. It also hosts the local preschool, and annual events including Childrey music festival, Bonfire night celebrations and the local spring classic cycling sportive. Childrey Football Club play in the North Berks Football League. Challow and Childrey Cricket Club is based at Vicarage Hill in nearby East Challow, and represents both villages.

Childrey had a post office until it ceased trading in June 2008. There is still a village shop. The last pub in the village, The Hatchet, ceased trading in 2016, but reopened in August 2021 for 4 days each week.

== Bibliography ==
- Beeson, CFC (1989) [1962]. Simcock, AV (ed.). Clockmaking in Oxfordshire 1400–1850 (3rd ed.). Oxford: Museum of the History of Science. pp. 85, 176. ISBN 0-903364-06-9.
- Dalby, LJ (2000) [1971]. The Wilts and Berks Canal (3rd ed.). Usk: Oakwood Press. p. 23. ISBN 0-85361-562-4.
- Ekwall, Eilert (1960) [1936]. Concise Oxford Dictionary of English Place-Names (4th ed.). Oxford: Oxford University Press. Childrey, Hackpen Hill. ISBN 0198691033.
- Ditchfield, PH; Page, William, eds. (1907). "The Hospital of Childrey". A History of the County of Berkshire. Victoria County History. Vol. II. London: Archibald Constable & Co. p. 93.
- Page, William; Ditchfield, PH, eds. (1924). "Childrey". A History of the County of Berkshire. Victoria County History. Vol. IV. assisted by John Hautenville Cope. London: The St Katherine Press. pp. 272–279.
- Pevsner, Nikolaus (1966). Berkshire. The Buildings of England. Harmondsworth: Penguin Books. pp. 114–115.
