= Church Cowley Road =

Road in Cowley, Oxford, England

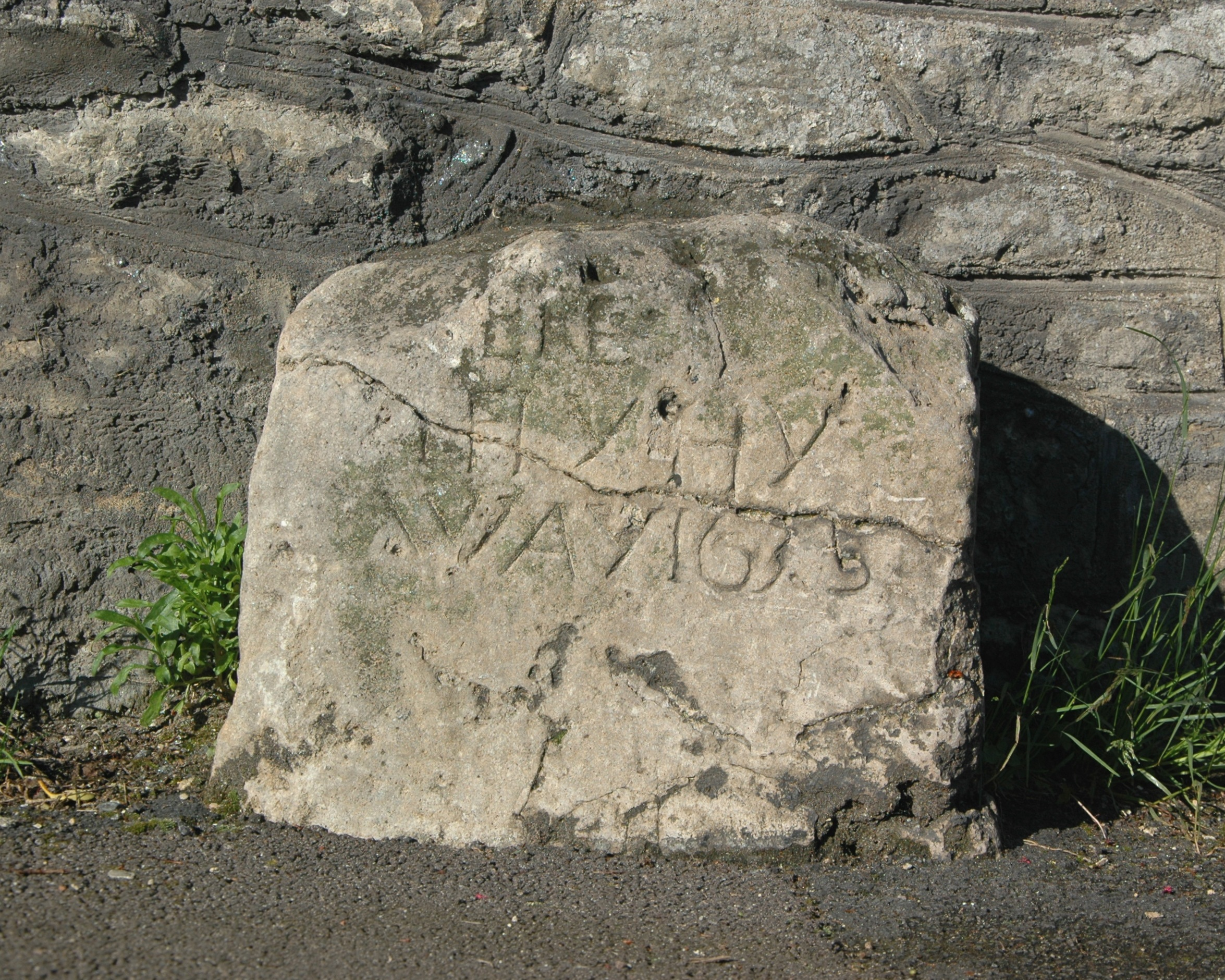
Roadside stone sign at the junction of Church Cowley Road, Henley Avenue, and Rose Hill, with the carved inscription "Here... Ifily Hy Way 1635".

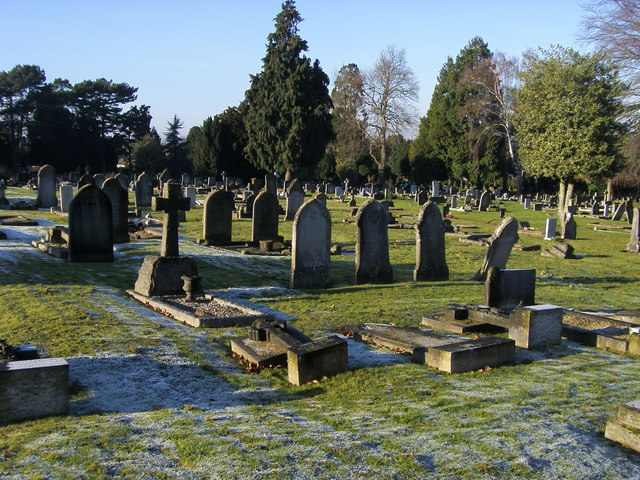
Rose Hill Cemetery, off Church Cowley Road.

Church Cowley Road is a major road in Cowley, Oxford, England, leading from Rose Hill to Cowley Centre. It continues as Between Towns Road.

== History ==
The original village of Cowley became known as "Church Cowley" in the 12th century to differentiate it from Temple Cowley, located to the east. In c.1250, the spelling was "Chirche Couele" and in 1316 "Church Couele", then "Churchcovell". The road was created between Church Cowley and Iffley Turn in 1853. It was previously known as Cemetery Road or New Road and was named "Church Cowley Road" in 1930.

== Location ==
The road is mainly residential. It has a church (the Parish Church of St James and the Apostle) and graveyard (Rose Hill Cemetery). It separates the area of Florence Park from Cowley and Littlemore.

House prices here are around average for the city of Oxford.

== Notable residents ==
The comedian Ronnie Barker lived in the road as a boy from the age of four, when his family moved there, and a blue plaque by the Oxfordshire Blue Plaques Board commemorates this.
