= Cyril Beeson =

British entomologist

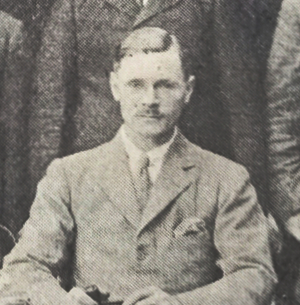
- Beeson in 1923
- Born: 10 February 1889; Headington, Oxfordshire, England
- Died: 3 November 1975 (aged 86)
- Education: City of Oxford High School for Boys; St John's College, Oxford
- Occupations: entomologist; antiquarian horologist

Cyril Frederick Cherrington Beeson CIE, D.Sc. (1889–1975) was an English entomologist and forest conservator who worked in India. Beeson was an expert on forest entomology who wrote numerous papers on insects, and whose book on Indian forest insects remains a standard work on the subject. After his retirement and return to England he became an antiquarian horologist.

== Family ==
Beeson was born in Oxford on 10 February 1889 to Walter Thomas Beeson and Rose Eliza Beeson, née Clacey. Walter Beeson was Surveyor to St John's College, Oxford.

In 1922, Beeson married Marion Cossentine, daughter of Samuel Fitze. They had a daughter, Barbara Rose, who was born about 1925. Marion died in 1946 after a long period of ill-health. In 1971, aged 82, Beeson married his second wife, Mrs Margaret Athalie Baldwin Carbury, formerly of Kenya, daughter of Cecil William Allen.

Beeson died on 3 November 1975.

== Education ==
Beeson attended City of Oxford High School for Boys, where his best friend was T. E. Lawrence (known to Beeson as "Ned", later coming to be known as Lawrence of Arabia). Lawrence called him by his nickname of "Scroggs".

At the age of 15 Beeson and Lawrence bicycled around Berkshire, Buckinghamshire and Oxfordshire, visited almost every village's parish church, studied their monuments and antiquities and made rubbings of their monumental brasses. The two schoolboys monitored building sites in Oxford and presented their finds to the Ashmolean Museum. The Ashmolean's Annual Report for 1906 said that the pair "by incessant watchfulness secured everything of antiquarian value which has been found". In the summers of 1906 and 1907 Beeson and Lawrence toured France by bicycle, collecting photographs, drawings and measurements of medieval castles. Beeson made many of the drawings that Lawrence used in his thesis The influence of the Crusades on European Military Architecture – to the end of the 12th century, which was published in 1936 as Crusader Castles.

Beeson entered the University of Oxford in 1907 to read geology. He was a non-collegiate student until 1908, when he won an exhibition that enabled him to enter St John's College. He graduated in 1910 but then changed disciplines to forestry, in which he obtained a diploma. He received his MA in 1917 and an Oxford D.Sc. in 1923.

== Army service ==
Beeson was a captain in the Royal Army Medical Corps in the First World War.

== Forest entomologist ==
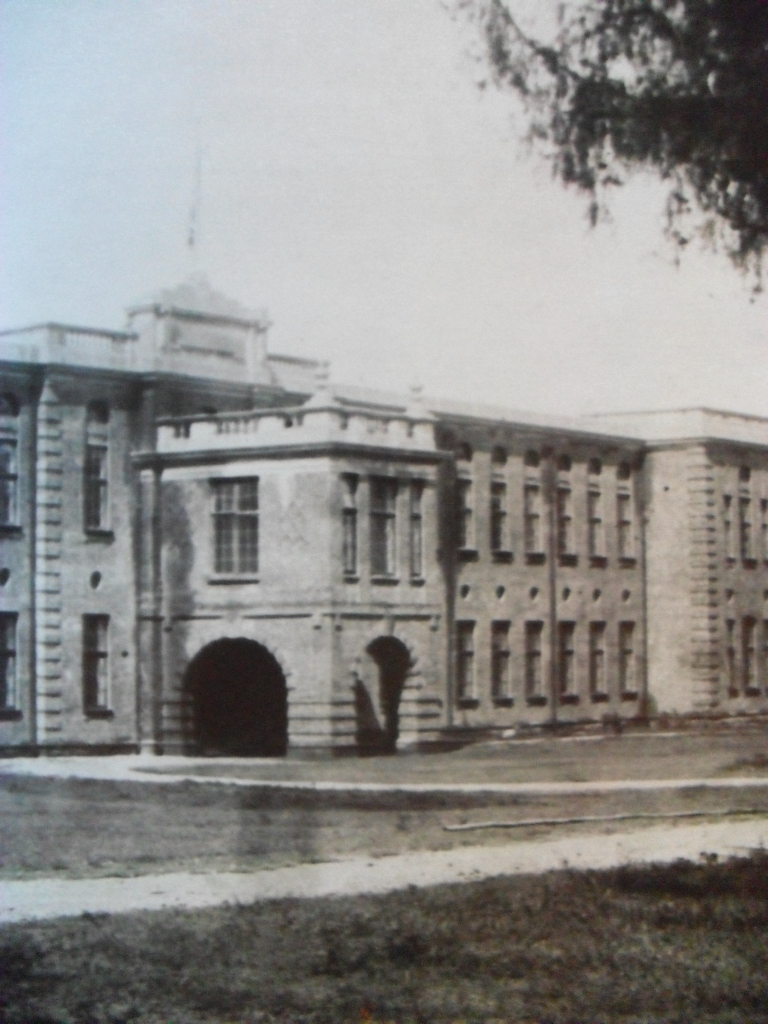
Part of the Forest Research Institute at Dehradun in 1915, when Beeson was Forest Zoologist of India

From 1911 until 1941 Beeson worked for the Imperial Forest Service (IFS) as a research officer, forest conservator and forest entomologist. The IFS seconded him to study tropical and forest entomology in London and Germany, after which he first served in the Punjab. In 1913 he was appointed Forest Zoologist of India. Beeson was closely involved with the development of the Forest Research Institute at Dehradun. In 1922 his post was renamed Forest Entomologist. He served in the same position until his retirement in 1941, when he was made a Companion of the Order of the Indian Empire.

Beeson's first book, The Ecology and Control of the Forest Insects of India and the Neighbouring Countries was published in 1941. It remained the standard work in its field, being republished in 1961 and 1993.

Beeson returned to Oxford, where he became Director of the Imperial Forestry Bureau from 1945 to 1947. While he was Director of the IFB, Beeson and his wife moved to Adderbury in North Oxfordshire.

The scale insect genus Beesonia was named after Beeson who collected specimens described by Edward Ernest Green in 1926. It is placed in a family Beesoniidae.

== Antiquarian horologist ==
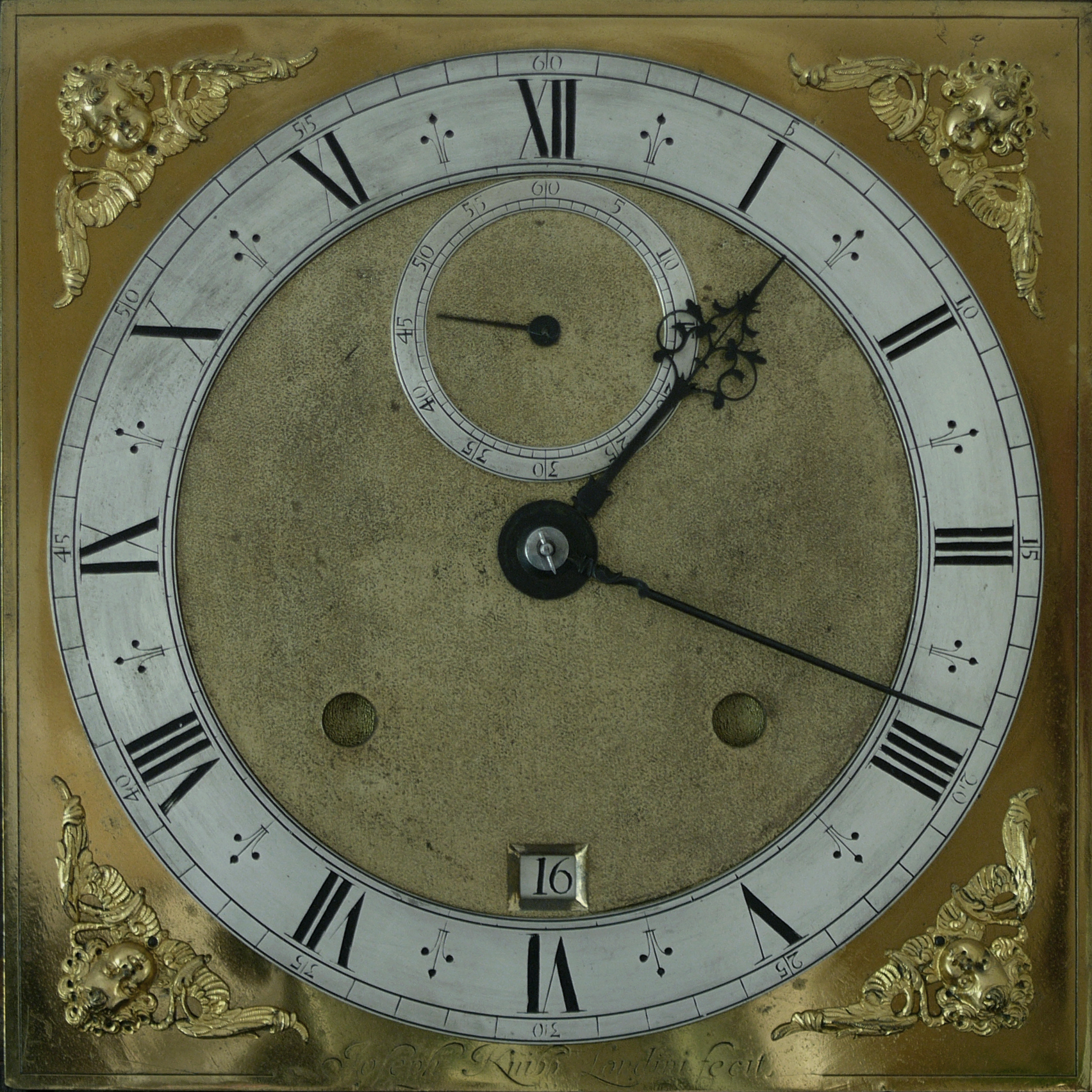
Nine-inch square dial of month-going walnut longcase clock, signed Joseph Knibb Londini fecit, circa 1675

When the couple moved to Adderbury, Beeson began to collect antique clocks, many of which originated from Oxfordshire. Beeson turned his scholarly and scientific approach to antiquarian horology, and in 1953 became a founder member of the Antiquarian Horological Society. He contributed many articles to the AHS's quarterly academic journal Antiquarian Horology, and edited it for the year 1959–60.

Beeson became a published authority on the prominent clockmakers Joseph Knibb (1640–1711) and John Knibb (1650–1722). Beeson's own collection included five clocks and three watches by John Knibb. He also developed a special interest in turret clocks and made an influential study of the clock installed in 1669 at Wadham College, Oxford, which he proposed was made by Joseph Knibb.

Beeson joined the Banbury Historical Society soon after its foundation in 1958. He was Chairman of the BHS 1959–60 and founding editor of its journal Cake and Cockhorse 1959–62. In 1962 the AHS and BHS jointly published the first edition of Beeson's monograph, Clockmaking in Oxfordshire 1400–1850.

In 1924 the Museum of the History of Science, Oxford started a small collection of historic clocks and watches. In 1966 Beeson greatly expanded this by presenting the Museum with his own historic collection, which included 42 longcase clocks, 24 other clocks and 13 watches. In 1967 the Museum published a second, enlarged edition of his book Clockmaking in Oxfordshire 1400–1850. In 1971 the Museum published a broader study by Beeson, English Church Clocks 1280–1850: History and Classification. This led the AHS in 1973 to form its turret clock section, of which Beeson became chairman. In 1972 Lord Bullock, Vice-Chancellor of the University of Oxford opened the Museum of the History of Science's Beeson Room to house its horological collection.

For his final book Beeson returned to one of the castles in France that had interested him and T.E. Lawrence as teenagers. Perpignan 1356: The Making of a Tower Clock and Bell for the King's Castle is a substantial account of the tower clock and bell made in 1356 for the Palace of the Kings of Majorca at Perpignan.

== Published works ==
Over a period of more than 30 years Beeson published more than 60 scientific articles on tropical forest insects. He also edited the Indian forestry journal. Listed below are only the books that Beeson wrote, including journal articles that were republished as books.

- Beeson, C.F.C. (1993) [1941]. The Ecology and Control of the Forest Insects of India and the Neighbouring Countries. Dehra Dun: Bishen Singh Mahendra Pal Singh. ISBN 8121100747.
- Beeson, C.F.C. (1962). Clockmaking in Oxfordshire 1400–1850. Monographs. Vol. 2. London: Antiquarian Horological Society.
- Beeson, C.F.C. (1967) [1962]. Clockmaking in Oxfordshire 1400–1850 (2nd ed.). Oxford: Museum of the History of Science.
- Beeson, C.F.C. (1969). An Early Anchor Escapement in a Turret Clock. London: Antiquarian Horological Society.
- Beeson, C.F.C. (1971). English Church Clocks 1280–1850: History and Classification. Chichester: Phillimore. ISBN 0901180041.
- Beeson, C.F.C. (1989) [1962]. Simcock, A.V. (ed.). Clockmaking in Oxfordshire 1400–1850 (3rd ed.). Oxford: Museum of the History of Science. ISBN 0-903364-06-9.
- Beeson, C.F.C. (1982). Perpignan 1356: The Making of a Tower Clock and Bell for the King's Castle. New England Monographs in Geography. Ramsgate: Antiquarian Horological Society. ISBN 0901180238.

== Sources ==
- Beeson, C.F.C. (1989) [1962]. Simcock, A.V (ed.). Clockmaking in Oxfordshire 1400–1850 (3rd ed.). Oxford: Museum of the History of Science. pp. 1–10, 117–124. ISBN 0-903364-06-9.
- Debrett's Peerage, Baronetage and Knightage. Debrett's Ltd. 1973.
- Green, E.E. (1928). "Further Observations on Beesonia dipterocarpi". Bulletin of Entomological Research. 19 (2): 205–207. doi:10.1017/s0007485300020496.
- Kulshrestha, S.K. (1997). Dictionary of Indian Entomologists. Surya International Publications.
