= IC 4996 =

Open cluster in the constellation Cygnus

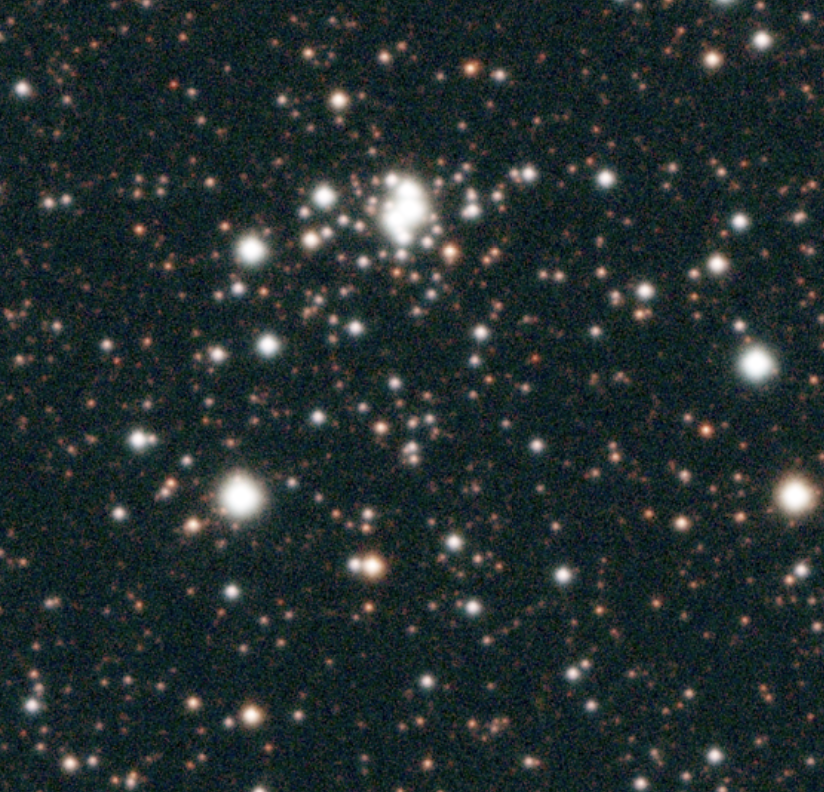
- IC 4996 imaged in 2026

Observation data
- Right ascension: 20^{h} 17^{m} 31^{s}
- Declination: +37° 38′ 18″
- Distance: 5,600 (1,937)
- Apparent magnitude (V): 7.3
- Apparent dimensions (V): 6'

Physical characteristics
- Estimated age: 6-9 Myr
- Other designations: Cr 418

Associations
- Constellation: Cygnus

IC 4996 is an open cluster in Cygnus. It is located on the galactic plane. Is is located in the same part of the sky as LBN 206 and LBN 209. IC 4996 is a young open cluster. The cluster contains 76 known stars. The cluster contains a trapezium made of seven bright stars. These seven stars are all between around magnitudes 8-9.

== History ==
The cluster was first observed by William Herschel on September 20, 1786, however was not included in his catalogue or the NGC catalogue. His discovery of the cluster remained unpublished and unknown until his work was reviewed by Wolfgang Steinicke. German astronomer Hugo Clemens would independently discover the cluster on Jun 13, 1896, which was published in the Publications of the Astrophysical Observatory of Potsdam. It would be independently discovered a third time by Frank Arthur Bellamy on October 9, 1903. John Dreyer was unaware of Clemens' discovery of the cluster when including it in the IC catalog in 1908, and therefore cited Bellamy as the discoverer.

It was previously believed that IC 4996 was a member of the Cyg OB1 stellar association, however the cluster is located 4.6 times further away than the association, meaning it is not. It is possible, though yet unproven, that IC 4996 may be a part of the Cyg OB3 association.

It is located 28' from P Cygni. P Cygni is the brightest star in another hypothetical open cluster, the accordingly named P Cygni Cluster, which is thought to form a double cluster with IC 4996. The hypothesis was first proposed in 2001, however evidence to support it was not uncovered until 2020, when data from Gaia revealed that the proper motion of P Cygni and IC 4996 allowed for the double cluster hypothesis to be true. It is yet to be completely proven.
