= Samuel Knibb =

Samuel Knibb (1625–1674) was a clockmaker and instrument-maker.

He was born in Newport, Wales. Active between 1663 and 1670, he moved to London to work in Henri Sutton's (c. 1637–1665) shop. Together, they built an important arithmetical calculator and many quadrants. He also worked with his cousin, Joseph Knibb.
