= Turret clock =

Large prominently located clock used as a public amenity

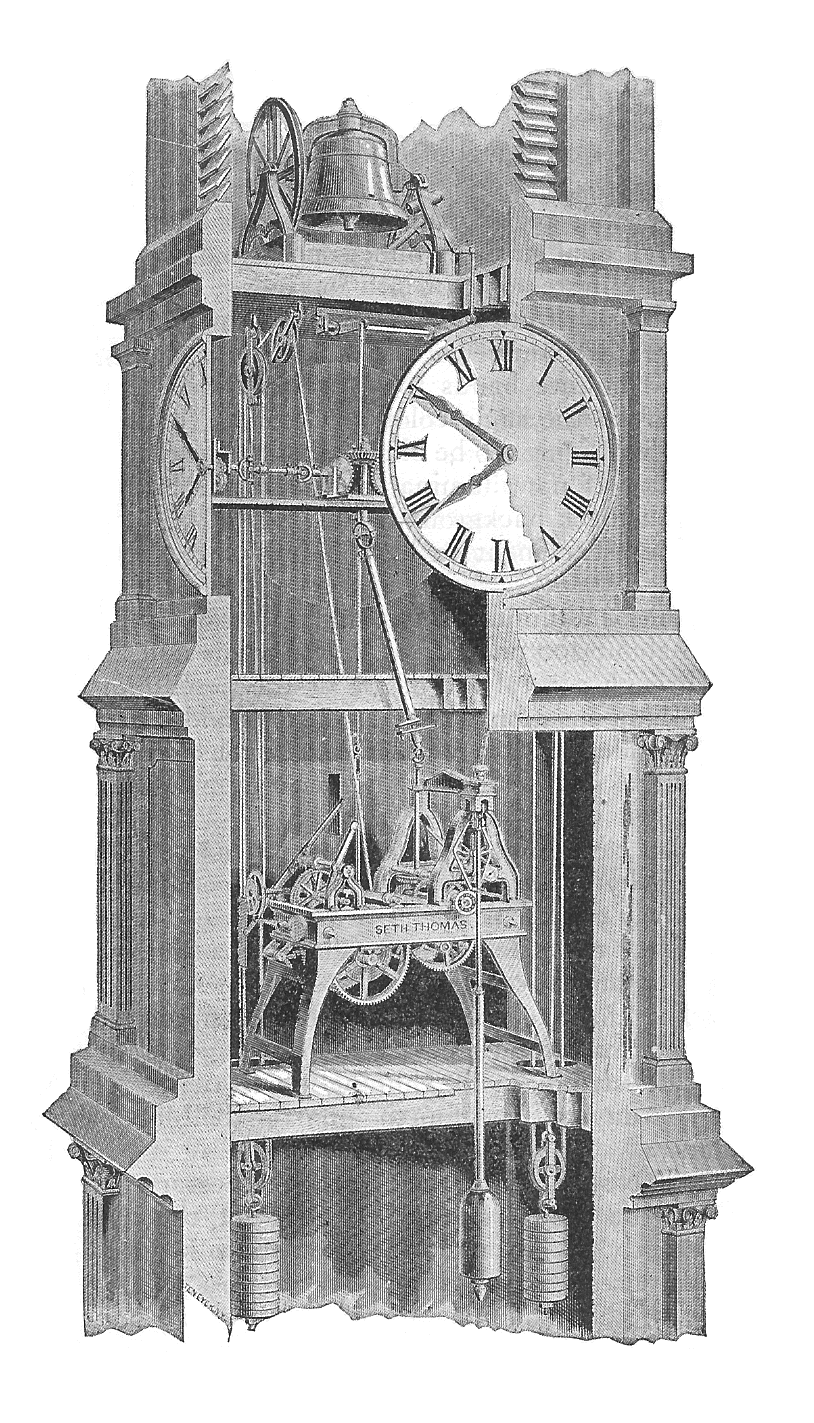
Modern striking turret clock movement mounted in a clock tower. Clock faces on all four sides of the tower are driven by a shaft from the movement below

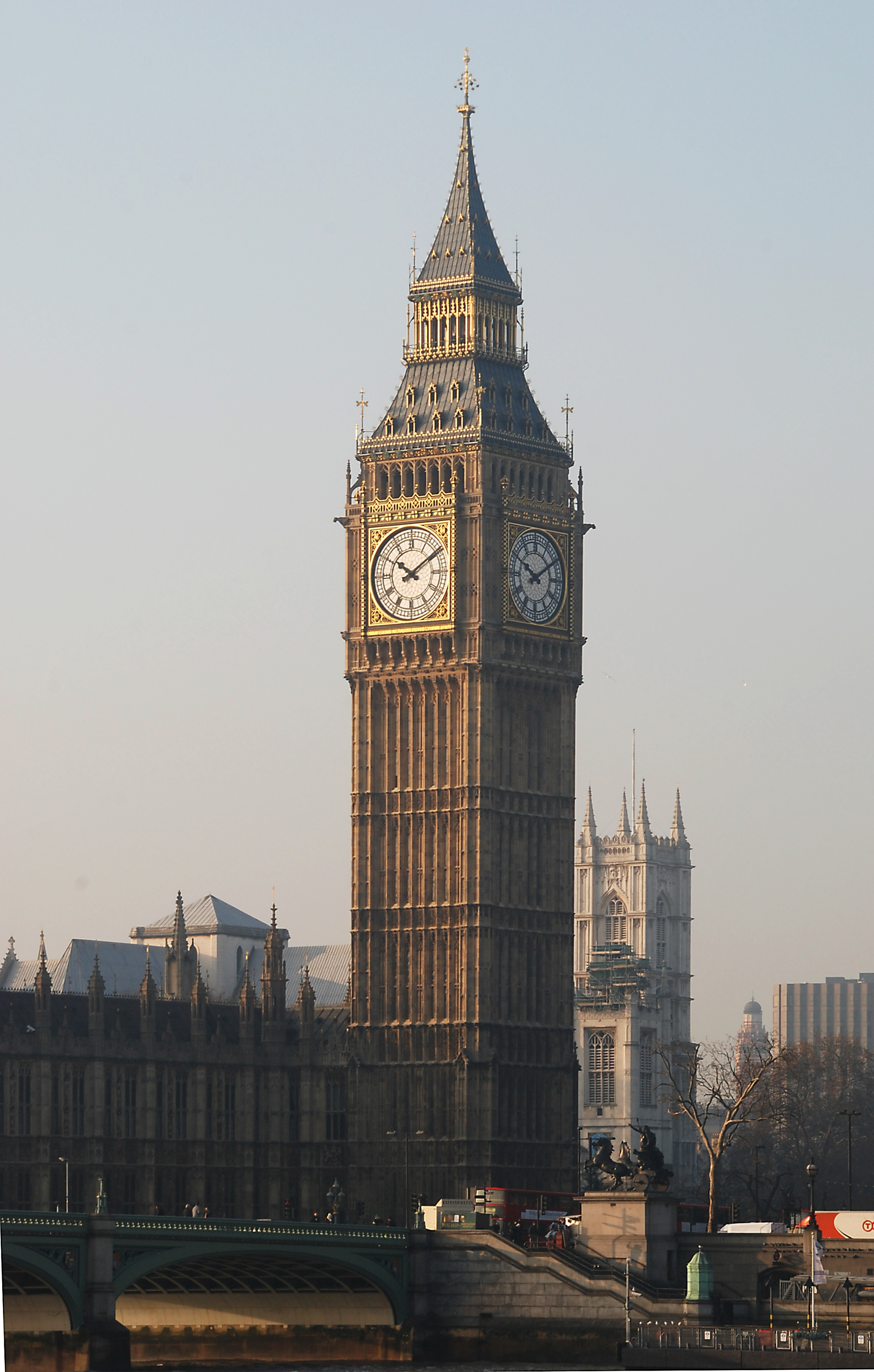
Probably the most famous turret clock is located in the Elizabeth Tower at the north end of the Palace of Westminster in London and rings the bell "Big Ben"

A turret clock or tower clock is a clock designed to be mounted high in the wall of a building, usually in a clock tower, in public buildings such as churches, university buildings, and town halls. As a public amenity to enable the community to tell the time, it has a large face visible from far away, and often a striking mechanism which rings bells upon the hours.

The turret clock is one of the earliest types of clock. Beginning in 12th century Europe, towns and monasteries built clocks in high towers to strike bells to call the community to prayer. Public clocks played an important timekeeping role in daily life until the 20th century, when accurate watches became cheap enough for ordinary people to afford. Today the time-disseminating functions of turret clocks are not much needed, and they are mainly built and preserved for traditional, decorative, and artistic reasons.

To turn the large hands and run the striking train, the mechanism of turret clocks must be more powerful than that of ordinary clocks. Traditional turret clocks are large pendulum clocks run by hanging weights, but modern ones are often run by electricity.

== History ==
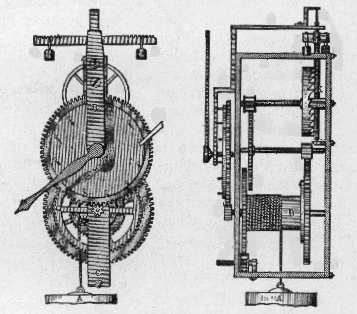
Verge and foliot tower clock mechanism in the De Wyck (De Vick) clock, built in Paris by Henri de Wyck in 1379.

=== Water clocks ===
Water clocks are reported as early as the 16th century B.C. and were used in the ancient world, but these were domestic clocks. Beginning in the Middle Ages around 1000 A.D. striking water clocks were invented, which rang bells on the canonical hours for the purpose of calling the community to prayer. Installed in clock towers in cathedrals, monasteries and town squares so they could be heard at long distances, these were the first turret clocks. By the 13th century towns in Europe competed with each other to build the most elaborate, beautiful clocks. Water clocks kept time by the rate of water flowing through an orifice. Since the rate of flow varies with pressure which is proportional to the height of water in the source container, and viscosity which varies with temperature during the day, water clocks had limited accuracy. Other disadvantages were that they required water to be manually hauled in a bucket from a well or river to fill the clock reservoir every day, and froze solid in winter.

=== Verge and foliot clocks ===
The first all-mechanical clocks which emerged in Europe in the late 13th century kept time with a verge escapement and foliot (also known as crown and balance wheels). In the second half of the 14th century, over 500 striking turret clocks were installed in public buildings all over Europe. The new mechanical clocks were easier to maintain than water clocks, as the power to run the clock was provided by turning a crank to raise a weight on a cord, and they also did not freeze during winter, so they became the standard mechanism used in the turret clocks being installed in bell towers in churches, cathedrals, monasteries and town halls all over Europe.

The verge and foliot timekeeping mechanism in these early mechanical clocks was very inaccurate, as the primitive foliot balance wheel did not have a balance spring to provide a restoring force, so the balance wheel was not a harmonic oscillator with an inherent resonant frequency or "beat"; its rate varied with variations in the force of the wheel train. The error in the first mechanical clocks may have been several hours per day. Therefore, the clock had to be frequently reset by the passage of the sun or stars overhead.

=== Pendulum clocks ===
The pendulum clock was invented and patented in 1657 by Dutch scientist Christiaan Huygens, inspired by the superior timekeeping properties of the pendulum discovered beginning in 1602 by Italian scientist Galileo Galilei. Pendulum clocks were much more accurate than the previous foliot clocks, improving timekeeping accuracy of the best precision clocks from 15 minutes per day to perhaps 10 seconds a day. Within a few decades most tower clocks throughout Europe were rebuilt to convert the previous verge and foliot escapement to pendulums. Almost no examples of the original verge and foliot mechanisms of these early clocks have survived to the present day.

The accuracy of the pendulum clock was increased by the invention of the anchor escapement in 1657 by Robert Hooke, which quickly replaced the primitive verge escapement in pendulum clocks. The first tower clock with the new escapement was the Wadham College Clock, built at Wadham College, Oxford, UK, in 1670, probably by clockmaker Joseph Knibb. The anchor escapement reduced the pendulum's width of swing from 80 to 100° in the verge clock to 3-6°. This greatly reduced the energy consumed by the pendulum, and allowed longer pendulums to be used. While domestic pendulum clocks usually use a seconds pendulum 1.0 meter (39 in) long, tower clocks often use a 1.5 second pendulum, 2.25 m (7.4 ft) long, or a two-second pendulum, 4 m (13 ft) long.

Tower clocks had a source of error not found in other clocks: the varying torque on the wheel train caused by the weight of the huge external clock hands as they turned, which was made worse by seasonal snow, ice and wind loads on the hands. The variations in force, applied to the pendulum by the escape wheel, caused the period of the pendulum to vary. During the 19th century specialized escapements were invented for tower clocks to mitigate this problem. In the most common type, called gravity escapements, instead of applying the force of the gear train to push the pendulum directly, the escape wheel instead lifted a weighted lever, which was then released and its weight gave the pendulum a push during its downward swing. This isolated the pendulum from variations in the drive force. One of the most widely used types was the three-legged gravity escapement invented in 1854 by Edmund Beckett (Lord Grimsthorpe).

=== Electrical clocks ===
Electric turret clocks and hybrid mechanical/electric clocks were introduced in the late 19th century. Some mechanical turret clocks are wound by an electric motor. These are still considered to be mechanical clocks.

== Table of early public turret clocks ==
This table shows some of the turret clocks which were installed throughout Europe. It is not complete and mainly serves to illustrate the rate of adoption. There are hardly any surviving turret clock mechanisms that date before 1400, and because of extensive rebuilding of clocks the authenticity of those that do survive is disputed. What little is known of their mechanisms is mostly gleaned from manuscript sources.

The "country" column refers to the present (2012) international boundaries. For example, Colmar was in Germany in 1370, but is now in France.

=== Thirteenth century ===
The verge and foliot escapement is thought to have been introduced sometime at the end of the thirteenth century, so very few if any of these clocks had foliot mechanisms; most were water clocks or in a few cases, possibly mercury.

Year	Country	Place	Location	Name	Type	Mention	Comment
1283	England	Dunstable	Priory	horologium	not known	Annals of the priory 1283 – Eodem anno fecimus horologium quod est supra pulpitum collocatum.	Probably a verge and foliot clock because it was mounted over the rood screen, where refilling a water clock would have been difficult, it has been proposed as the earliest known mechanical clock.
1284	England	Exeter	Cathedral	Exeter cathedral clock	not known	grant made July 1284 to Roger de Ropford, bellfounder, to repair "orologium"	It is unlikely that this 1284 clock was a verge and foliot clock. The clock mentioned in the grant was probably a water clock. In 1423, a new clock was installed, which is probably the one from which remnants of the striking train can still be seen.
1286	England	London	St Paul's Cathedral	Bartholomo Orologiario clock	not known	Compotus Bracini 1286	probably a water clock
1288 (?)	England	Oxford	Merton College		not known	bursarial accounts "Expense orologii"	probably a water clock
1290	England	Norwich	Norwich Cathedral		not known	Sacrist's roll 1290 "In emendacione orologio"	probably a water clock
1291	England	Ely	Ely Abbey		not known	Sacrist's roll 1291 "pro custodia orologii"	probably a water clock
1292	England	Canterbury	Christchurch Cathedral	novum orolgium	not known	list of Prior Henry of Eastry's works "novum orologium mangum in Ecclesia"	probably a water clock

=== Fourteenth century ===
During the fourteenth century, the emergence of the foliot replaced the high-maintenance water clocks. It is not known when that happened exactly and which of the early 14th century clocks were water clocks and which ones use a foliot.

The Heinrich von Wieck clock in Paris dating from 1362 is the first clock of which it is known with certainty that it had a foliot and a verge escapement. The fact that there is a sudden increase in the number of recorded turret clock installations points to the fact that these new clocks use verge & foliot. This happens in the years 1350 and onwards.

Year	Country	Place	Location	Name	Type	Mention	Comment
1304	Germany	Erfurt	Benedict abbey St. Peter	"Schelle"	not known	consecration of "Petronella" and "Scolastica"	probably a mechanical alarm clock
1305	Germany	Augsburg	cathedral		not known	the "Domkustos" E. v. Nidlingen donates to the cathedral a "good and well adjusted clock"	probably a mechanical alarm clock
1306	England	Salisbury	Salisbury Cathedral		not known	composition concluded 26 August 1306 "Before the clock of the cathedral had struck one no person was to purchase or cause to be purchased ....	probably a water clock
1308	France	Cambrai	Cathedral		not known	mention of a clock, which was mended and equipped with moving figures in 1348, and fitted with a strike and an angel in 1398	
1309	Italy	Milan	church St. Eustorgio		not known	mention of a metal clock, which was repaired in 1333 and 1555	
1314	France	Caen	church St. Pierre		not known	mention of a striking clock	
1316	Poland	Brzeg	town hall		not known	weights of the clock still present. New bell cast for clock 1370, replaced by new clock 1414	
1322	England	Norwich	Norwich Cathedral priory	Norwich Cathedral astronomical clock	astronomical clock	Sacrist's roll of Norwich cathedral of 1322 to 1325 mentions the construction and installation of a clock which had a large astronomical dial and automata including 59 images and a choir or procession of monks	earliest detailed account of the organisation and of the craftsmen and materials involved in such a project
1325–43	France	Cluny	collegiate church		not known	Petrus de Chastelux builds a new clock	
1327	England	St Albans	St Albans Cathedral		astronomical clock	drawings	Earliest clock for which there is detailed description of the escapement, this had a 'strob' escapement, a variation of a verge and foliot with two escape wheels.
1336	Italy	Milan	town		public striking clock with 24-hour dial	Annales Mediolanenses Anonymi	According to Bilfinger, this is the first mechanical striking clock and could have been made by de Dondi. This is the first time a clock is mentioned that strikes consecutive hours, e.g. once at 1, twice at two, etc. and that strikes day and night. As there are detailed descriptions of what the clock does, it was considered a novelty. Another candidate for the first mechanical clock.
1348–64	Italy	Padua	Castle Tower	Astrarium	astronomical clock with strike, verge and crown balance wheel	Il Tractatus Astarii	Giovanni de Dondi
1351	England	Windsor Castle	Great Tower			made in London by three Lombards (from Italy) who arrived 8/4/1352 and left on 24 May 1352	
1351	Italy	Orvieto	clock tower next to the cathedral		striking clock with jacquemart		
1352–1354	France	Strasbourg	cathedral		astronomical clock. Three dials: bottom year dial with saint days, middle hour dial, top hourly procession of 3 kings before Maria, at the top a crowing rooster.		taken out of service in 1547
1353	Italy	Genoa			striking clock		
1354	Italy	Florence	Palazzo Vecchio				
1355–71	Italy	Reggio			striking clock		
1356	Italy	Bologna	castle tower		striking clock		
1356–1361	Germany	Nuremberg	Frauenkirche		striking clock with display of the prince-electors around the Kaiser		substituted in 1508/09 with the clock on the outside of the Frauenkirche
1359	Germany	Frankenberg	Pfarrkirche		astronomical clock with the three kings around the Virgin Mary		
1359	Italy	Siena	city tower			Bartolo Giordi mounts a clock on the city tower	
1361	Germany	Frankfurt	cathedral		astronomical clock		made by Jacob, improved 1383, taken out of service 1605
1361	Germany	Munich	city tower			mention of existing clock	
1362	Belgium	Brussels	St Nicholas church		not known	mention of a turret clock	
1362	Italy	Ferrara	castle tower			clock mounted on castle tower	
1362–1370	France	Paris	Tour de l'Horloge		verge and foliot striking clock	Froissart's poem "L'Horloge amoureuse" mentions the clock. Drawing exists.	a drawing of the going train shows a door frame construction. Built by the German Heinrich von Wiek.
1364	Germany	Augsburg	Perlachturm		striking clock		clock was repaired in 1369 and a quarter strike was added in 1526
1365–1367	England	London	Westminster Palace		not known		a clock tower on the north wall at the end of the King's Garden opposite the entrance to the great hall was begun in 1365 and finished in 1367.
1366	Spain	Toledo	cathedral			goldsmith Gonzalo Perez supplies a clock for the tower of the cathedral	
1366–1368	Switzerland	Zurich	Petersturm		striking clock	Master Chunrad von Cloten builds a striking clock for the Petersturm	
1366	England	Kent	Queenborough Castle		striking clock		
1367	Poland	Wrocław	town hall			mention of existing town hall clock	
1368	England	Kings Langley	Kings Langley Manor		striking clock	Edward III provided a patent giving safe conduct to three Flemish clockmakers. These people probably built the clock.	after the expiry of the patent in 1369 John Lincoln was appointed as Royal clock keeper.
1368	Czechia	Opava				Town council signs contract with master Swelbel to furnish a clock	
1369	Germany	Mainz	Pfarrkirche St. Quentin		striking clock		
1370	France	Colmar	cathedral tower		striking clock		
1370	Poland	Świdnica				the town council engages the services of master Swelbel to furnish a clock, that is as good or better than the clock at Wroclaw.	
1371	England	York	York Minster		striking clock	Fabric Rolls of York Minster record purchase of a new clock made by John Clareburgh in 1371 or £13 6s. 8d.	
1372	Belgium	Golzinne	castle		striking clock	Louis Defiens furnishes a striking clock for the castle	
1372–1373	France	Strasbourg	cathedral		striking clock	Heinrich Halder mounts a striking clock on the cathedral tower	
1376	Belgium	Ghent	Belfried		striking clock		
1376	France	Sens				a clock with several bells is manufactured	
1376	France	Beauté-sur-Marne	castle			Pierre de S. Béate furnishes a clock for the castle	
1377	Belgium	Dendermonde	belfry			Jan van Delft manufactures a clock for the belfry	
1377	France	Valenciennes	town hall			the town hall clock is replaced and fitted with 2 striking figures	
1377	Italy	Vicenza	town hall		striking clock	Master Facius Pisanus manufactures a new striking clock for the town hall	
1377	Belgium	Ypres	belfry		striking clock with several bells		
1380	Germany	Bamberg	cathedral			clock installed at the cathedral	
1380	France	Nieppe	castle			Pierre Daimville engaged to furnish a metal clock weighing 300 pounds for the castle, which already has an existing clock	
1382–84	Germany	Hamburg	Nikolaikirche		striking clock	Blacksmith Schinkel furnishes a public striking clock for the Nikolaikirche	
1383–1384	France	Dijon	Notre-Dame		striking clock	the clock taken from Courtrai in Belgium in 1382 is mounted on the tower of Notre-Dame	
1383	Germany	Fritzlar				mention of a turret clock	
1383	France	Lyon	eglise St. Jean		striking clock	mention of a small striking clock at St. Jean	
1384	Germany	Friedberg			striking clock	Wernher von Ilbenstedt manufactures a striking clock	
1384	Germany	Minden	cathedral			mention of the cathedral clock being repaired	
1385	Switzerland	Luzern	Graggenturm		striking clock	Blacksmith H. Halder furnishes a striking clock for the Graggenturm and leaves a manual for the treatment of the clock	The operating instructions for this clock were written down, and clearly refer to a verge and foliot clock. the "frowen gemuete [happy/agitated mood]" is the foliot.
1386	Germany	Braunschweig	Katharinenkirche			Marquard furnishes a clock for the Katharinenkirche. The cathedral already had a clock in 1346	
1386	England	Salisbury	Salisbury Cathedral	Salisbury Cathedral clock	Striking Clock	Deed	might not be the clock on display at the cathedral
1386	Germany	Würzburg	cathedral			clock at the cathedral mentioned	
1388	France	Béthune	belfry		striking clock	The citizens of Bethune want to re-construct the existing belfry and put up a clock. "... pour pouvoir reconstruire leur beffroi qui etait a present moult demolis et venus k ruyne et en peril de keir (tomber) de jour en jour et en obtenir l'autorisation d'y placer une orloge pour memore des heures de jour et de nuit sicomme il est en pluseurs autres lieux et bonnes villes du paus environ".	We have a reference here on how common turret clocks have become – they refer to " a clock to remind of the hours of the day and the night as it is now common in other places and good towns ...". This is also a reference that shows that turret clocks struck the time day and night.
1388	Germany	Magdeburg	Cathedral		striking clock	mention of a striking clock at the cathedral	
1389	France	Rouen	belfry		striking clock with quarter strike	Jehan de Felains paid 70 Livres for a clock with a quarter strike for the belfry	
1391	France	Metz	cathedral		striking clock with quarter strike	Manufactured by Heinrich von Wieck	
1392	France	Chartres			striking clock	clockmaker and blacksmith Philibert Mauvoisin instructed to make a striking clock resembling the one at the Paris castle	
1392	Germany	Hanover	market church			blacksmiths Meistorpe and Hans Krieten furnish a clock for the market church	
1392–1393	England	Wells	Wells Cathedral		striking clock		if this is the clock now shown at the British Museum in London is questionable
1394	Germany	Stralsund	Nikolaikirche		astronomical clock	Nikolaus Lilienfeld furnished a clock for the Nikolaikirche	
1395	Germany	Doberan	church		astronomical clock	an astronomical clock similar to the one in Stralsund is put up at the church	
1395	Germany	Speyer	Altburgtor		striking clock	a striking clock is reported at the Altburgtor and at the Predigerkirche	
1398–1401	Germany	Villingen			astronomical clock	Master Claus Gutsch manufactures an astronomical clock after the Strasbourg clock.	

It becomes apparent that even small towns can afford to put up public striking clocks. Turret clocks are now common throughout Europe.

No surviving clock mechanisms (apart from the claims from Salisbury and Wells) is known from this era.

== See also ==
- History of timekeeping devices
- List of clocks
