= Stamp Collecting (magazine) =

- Front cover of 10 January 1931 issue
- Frequency: Weekly
- First issue: 20 September 1913
- Country: United Kingdom

Stamp Collecting was a weekly magazine of stamp collecting published in London from 1913 to 1984.

== Publication history ==
The magazine was first published by the Philatelic Press on 20 September 1913 before being suspended for five weeks at the outbreak of the First World War after which it was taken over by F. Hugh Vallancey in January 1915. Yearbooks were published for 1925, 1926-1927 and 1928–1929. In 1930 it was taken over by Stamp Collecting Limited under Douglas B. Armstrong who also became the editor. At different times, supplements were issued in the titles Stamp Collecting Literary Supplement, the Stamp Collecting Daily Edition (issued daily during the London Stamp Exhibition November 1928), and the Stamp Collecting Junior Edition.

In 1932 a free gift was given with the magazine to mark the 19th Philatelic Congress of Great Britain which was held in Brighton from June 13–19, 1932. This souvenir consisted of a postcard sized reproduction of the front of an 1840 'Mulready' Letter Sheet with the name, location and dates of the Congress in the 'address' space and with a subscript note reading 'With the Compliments of "Stamp Collecting" 15, St. Bride Street, E.C.4.'.

In 1969, The Philatelic Magazine was incorporated into Stamp Collecting. In 1984, the firm went into voluntary liquidation and Stamp Collecting and The Philatelic Magazine were acquired by Stamp News Limited and incorporated into Stamp News but that magazine itself ceased publication in 1986.
