= Lonsdale Road =

Road in Summertown, North Oxford, England

Coordinates: 51.77992°N 1.26222°W

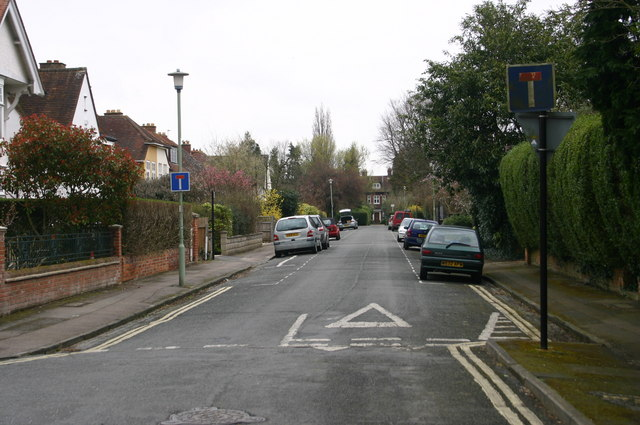
Lonsdale Road at the junction with King's Cross Road.

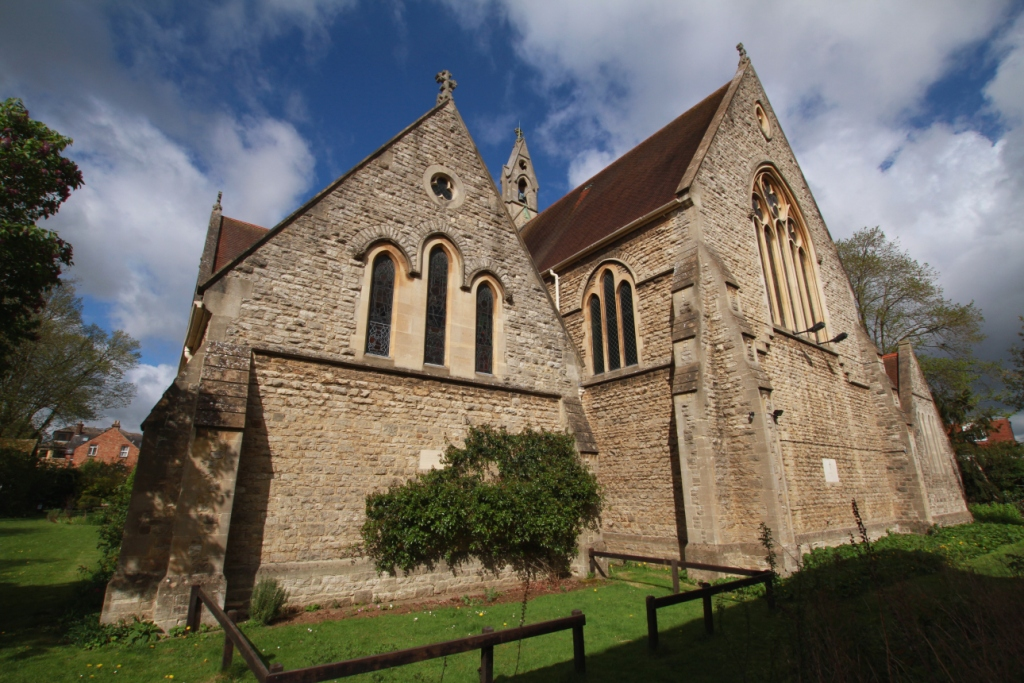
St Michael and All Angels parish church on the north side of Lonsdale Road.

Lonsdale Road is a residential road in Summertown, north Oxford, England.

The road runs between Banbury Road to the west and the River Cherwell to the east. To the south is Summer Fields School, a private preparatory school. St Michael and All Angels parish church is on the north side of Lonsdale Road, near the Banbury Road end.

Lonsdale Road is named after the Earl of Lonsdale. The road was named in 1905 although the first houses in the road were erected from 1902.

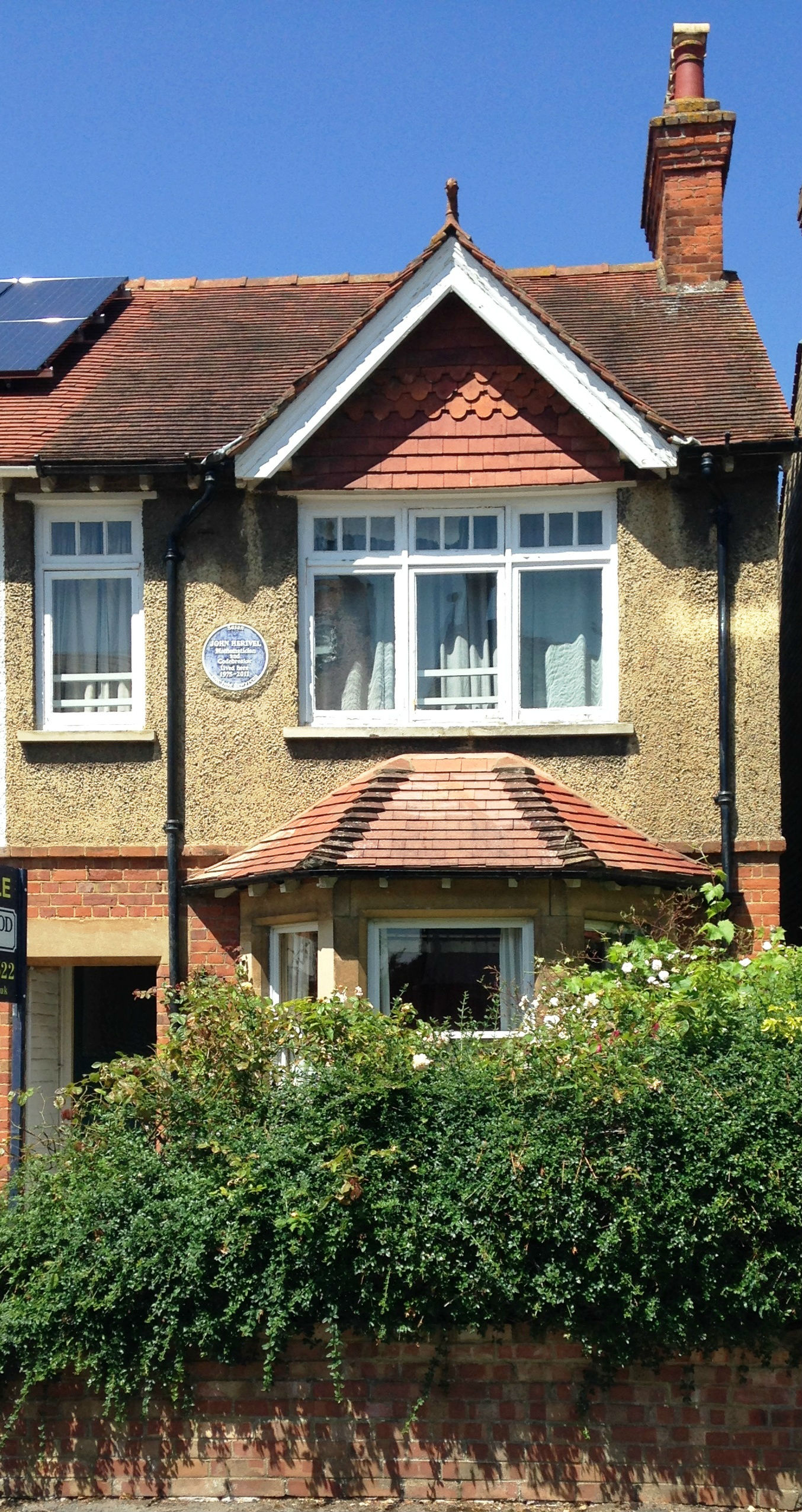
John Herivel's house in Lonsdale Road, with a blue plaque erected by his daughter.

== Notable residents ==
There have been a number of notable residents of Lonsdale Road, especially scientists, including two Nobel Prize winners. The following have been residents on the road:

- Sir Ludwig Guttmann (1899–1980), neurologist.
- John Herivel (1918–2011), mathematician, World War II codebreaker at Bletchley Park and historian of science.
- Sir Peter Hirsch (1925–2025), metallurgist.
- Tony Honoré (1921–2019), lawyer and jurist.
- Dame Louise Johnson (1940–2012), biochemist and protein crystallographer.
- Bertram Mandelbrote (1923–2010), psychiatrist and pioneer of mental healthcare.
- Jean Robinson (1930–2025), healthcare campaigner.
- Abdus Salam (1926–1996), physicist, Nobel Laureate in Physics (1979).
- Paul Thompson (born 1935), sociologist and pioneer of oral history.
- Niko Tinbergen (1907–1988), biologist and ornithologist, Nobel Laureate in Physiology or Medicine.
- Sir Douglas Veale (1891–1973) University Registrar

Three of the houses on the road bear blue plaques. The Oxfordshire Blue Plaques Board erected the plaques to Nikolaas Tinbergen and Ludwig Guttmann. The third, to John Herivel, is a private one created and installed by his daughter Susan.
