= Ethel Bellamy =

English astronomical computer and seismologist

- Ethel Bellamy in 1934
- Born: Ethel Frances Butwell Bellamy; 17 November 1881; Oxford, England
- Died: 7 December 1960 (aged 79)
- Occupations: Computer; Seismologist

Ethel Frances Butwell Bellamy (17 November 1881 – 7 December 1960) was an English astronomical computer and seismologist known for her significant contributions to the field of astronomy and seismology. Bellamy collected, measured and updated observations from seismological stations around the world, and served as editor of the International Seismological Summary. In 1928 she was awarded a silver medal by the Pope for her work on understanding the Vatican zone plates.

== Early life and education ==
Bellamy was born in Oxford. She was the daughter of Montague Edward James Butwell Bellamy (1850–1908) and Mary Bellamy (née Castell). Her uncle Frank Arthur Bellamy was senior assistant at the Radcliffe Observatory of the University of Oxford; where Bellamy began working part-time at the age of 17, from home as an assistant. She performed computations for Oxford's contributions to the Carte du Ciel and Astrographic Catalogue projects, under the directions of the Savilian Professor of Astronomy, Herbert Hall Turner.

== Career ==
In 1912 Turner appointed her as second assistant at the observatory, a permanent full-time post, for £50 a year. The job that she took had previously been occupied by another of her uncles, Frederick Bellamy, who had died at an early age before she was born.

After the completion of Oxford's role in the Astrographic Catalogue, Turner decided to assist the Vatican Observatory, which was having difficulty with its computations. From 1911 to 1928, Bellamy performed the reductions on the measurements and prepared the results for publication; the analysis of the Vatican's zone was "wholly in [her] hands". In recognition of her work on the Vatican she was presented a silver medal by the Pope in 1928. Her work was unpaid. By 1928 along with her her uncle she had catalogued the position of over a million stars.

In 1918 Bellamy became the observatory's seismology assistant. She spent part of 1919 in Shide, where she was responsible for Turner's seismological instruments. She operated seismometers, managing correspondence with up to six hundred seismograph stations, and collated the data to be analysed. These seismometers worked by measuring traces of passing vibrations that had been enlarged and transcribed onto a moving roll of photographic paper using light. The seismometers were transferred to the Clarendon Laboratory and, eventually, to the Oxford University Observatory.

After Turner, or, from 1923, a new assistant called Joseph Hughes, had computed the epicentres of earthquakes, Bellamy prepared the results for publication in the International Seismological Summary (ISS). During the Second World War, while Hughes was serving in the armed forces, Bellamy computed the epicentres herself for six issues. She collated readings, collected information by telegram and made seismological measurements of nearly 600 seismological stations around the world. This global network of seismological instruments is now digital and automated. Bellamy worked in an unheated hut until 1927, which caused her discomfort in addition to her generally poor health.

In 1930, the year of Turner's death, she became the editor of the International Seismological Summary. In memory of Turner, she voluntarily produced an index of epicentres for 1925–1935 and a map of the world showing their locations. Between 1913 and 1939 she published nine papers, including two with her uncle. Her uncle died in 1936, and despite their long partnership, her uncle left a valuable collection to Cambridge University, and left her no money. Bellamy's finances were helped when Cambridge University refused her uncle's bequest so that it could be sold.

In 1939, Bellamy published a paper in Nature in 1939 that focuses on the geographical distribution of epicenters of earthquakes recorded by the Seismological Committee of the British Association from 1913 to 1932.

== Personal life and legacy ==
Bellamy lived with her uncle Frank Bellamy from 1930 to 1949 at 2 Winchester Road, Oxford, a house that has a blue plaque in their memory.

Bellamy was a member of the British Association and was elected as a fellow of the Royal Astronomical Society on 12 March 1926. Oxford awarded her an honorary Master of Arts degree. In July 1947 she retired and moved to Upwey, Dorset. She died in Weymouth on 7 December 1960.
