= Douglas B. Armstrong =

British philatelist

Douglas Brawn Armstrong (2 November 1888 – 19 October 1969) was a British philatelist who was added to the Roll of Distinguished Philatelists in 1959.

He was the editor of Stamp Collecting magazine from 1933 to 1949 and a prolific philatelic author. He was also philatelic correspondent of The Times, the Bazaar, and Flight.

== Selected publications ==
- (in collaboration with C.B. Bostwick and A.J. Watkin) The Cayman Islands: Their Stamps and Post Office. London: Published for the Council of the Junior Philatelic Society by H.F. Johnson, 1910 24p.
- New Hebrides. London: W.H. Peckitt, 1910 20p.
- The Edwardian Stamps of the British Empire. Part I. London: Bright & Son, 1912 79p.
- The Postage Stamps of Anglo-Egyptian Sudan. London: Bright & Son, 1912 72p.
- The Boys' Book of Stamp Collecting. London: Grant Richards, 1913 227p.
- The Stamps of the Levant Post Offices. London: Bright & Son, 1913 128p.
- (with R.E.R. Dalwick) Stamps For Beginners: A Popular Guide to Stamp Collecting. London: The Philatelic Press and The Aldine Publishing Co., 1913 75p.
- Postage Stamps of War (1854-1914). London: The Holloway Press Co. (Philatelic Dept.), 1914 68p.
- British & Colonial Postage Stamps: A guide to the collection and appreciation of the adhesive postal issues of the British Empire. London: Methuen & Co. Ltd., 1920 224p.
- Postage Stamps of the Ukraine: tentative notes and check list. London: 'Stamp Collecting', 1920 24p.
- Stamps as An Investment and Hobby - notes for beginners. Dorking: R.E.R. Dalwick, 1920 32p.
- (with Chas. H. Greenwood) War Stamps of The Allies, 1914-1920: An Historical Record. London: 'Stamp Collecting', 1920 96p.
- Stamp Collecting for Pleasure and Profit: A Popular Guide to the Royal Hobby of Philately. London: C. Arthur Pearson, 1922 122p.
- Allied Postage Stamps of the Great War and After, 1914-1923: A Descriptive Catalogue and Guide for Collectors. 3rd Edition. London: D. Field, 1923 160p.
- The Romance of the Air Post: An Introduction to Air Post Collecting. London: Alan Turton, 1926 27p.
- Introduction to Edwardian Stamps, with tentative check list for collectors. London: Stamp Collecting Ltd.; The Westminster Stamp Co., 1936 35p.
- Silver Jubilee Stamps of the Empire: A Souvenir Record. London: Stamp Collecting Ltd., 1936 2nd Edition. 39p.
- Collecting Stamps. London: Stamp Collecting Ltd., 1938 50p.
- A Key to Stamp Collecting. London; Glasgow: Blackie & Son, 1938 134p.
- (with Michael Harrison) A New Approach to Stamp Collecting. London: B.T. Batsford, 1953 196p.
