= Wadham College Clock =

17th-century clock in Wadham College, Oxford

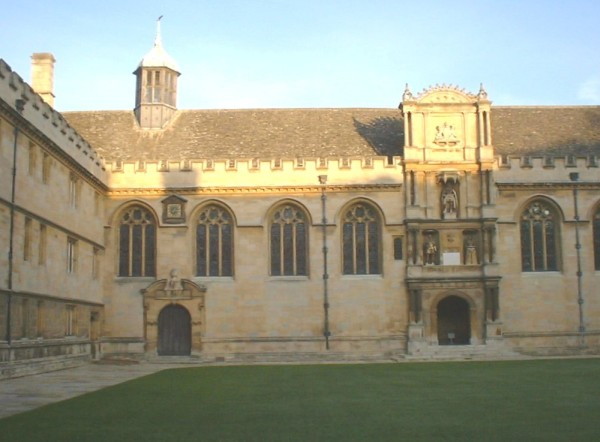
Clock in position over the west door of the college chapel

Wadham College Clock is a seventeenth-century clock in Wadham College in Oxford University, notable as being the first clock in the world to use the anchor escapement.

The clock was made by Joseph Knibb in 1670 and installed in the college in 1671. The clock face is still in its original location over the west door of the college chapel. The 1670 clock mechanism is now kept in the History of Science Museum, Oxford.
