= International Seismological Summary =

The International Seismological Summary (ISS) is a global earthquake catalog covering the period from 1918 to 1963.

The need for an international exchange of seismology data was recognised by John Milne, who in 1899 began collating and publishing data from 35 observatories from around the world. Following his death in 1913, the ISS was founded at the end of the war in 1918 to continue the work. Since 1964 it has been published as the International Seismological Centre Bulletin.
