= Frank Arthur Bellamy =

British astronomer

- Born: 17 October 1863; Oxford, England
- Died: 15 February 1936 (aged 72); Oxford, England

Frank Arthur Bellamy (17 October 1863 – 15 February 1936) was a British astronomer. He worked on Astrographic Catalogue with his niece, Ethel Bellamy.

== Life ==
Frank Bellamy was born at St John Street, Oxford in 1863, the son of the bookbinder Montague Bellamy.

Bellamy attended Magdalen College School, Oxford and a few months before his eighteenth birthday in July 1881 was appointed Second Assistant at the Radcliffe Observatory, a post that had previously been held by his older brothers Frederick and Harry. In 1903, he was one of three astronomers to independently discover IC 4996.

Bellamy became a British astronomer who worked on Astrographic Catalogue with his niece, Ethel Bellamy. Together they catalogued over 1,000,000 stars using photographic techniques. He was elected a fellow of the Royal Meteorological Society on 16 May 1883. He was also elected a fellow of the Royal Astronomical Society on 14 February 1896. Lastly he joined the British Astronomical Association on 27 December 1933.

Bellamy was the founding Secretary and Treasurer of the Oxford Philatelic Society, which was founded in 1890. For much of the time until his death, he remained in those two posts.

In 1930 Frank Bellamy and his niece Edith moved to 2 Winchester Road, Oxford, and it has a blue plaque in their memory.

Bellamy died in 1936 at 2 Winchester Road after falling out with his colleague H. H. Plaskett. Despite his long partnership with his niece, he left a valuable collection to Cambridge University. This was judged to be him placing his heritage to society higher than that to his family. His niece's finances were helped when Cambridge University refused Bellamy's bequest so that it could be sold.

He was buried in St Sepulchre's Cemetery, Oxford.

== Philatelic publications ==
- Oxford and Cambridge College Messengers Postage Stamps, Cards, and Envelopes 1871-86. 1921.
- A Concise Register of the College Messenger Postage Stamps, Envelopes, and Cards used in the Universities of Oxford and Cambridge 1871-95, together with the stamps used by the Oxford Union Society 1859-85. 1925.
- History of the PCGB 1909-12. (With J.J. Darlow)
