= Challow railway station =

Disused railway station in England

Coordinates: 51.61222°N 1.48872°W

Challow
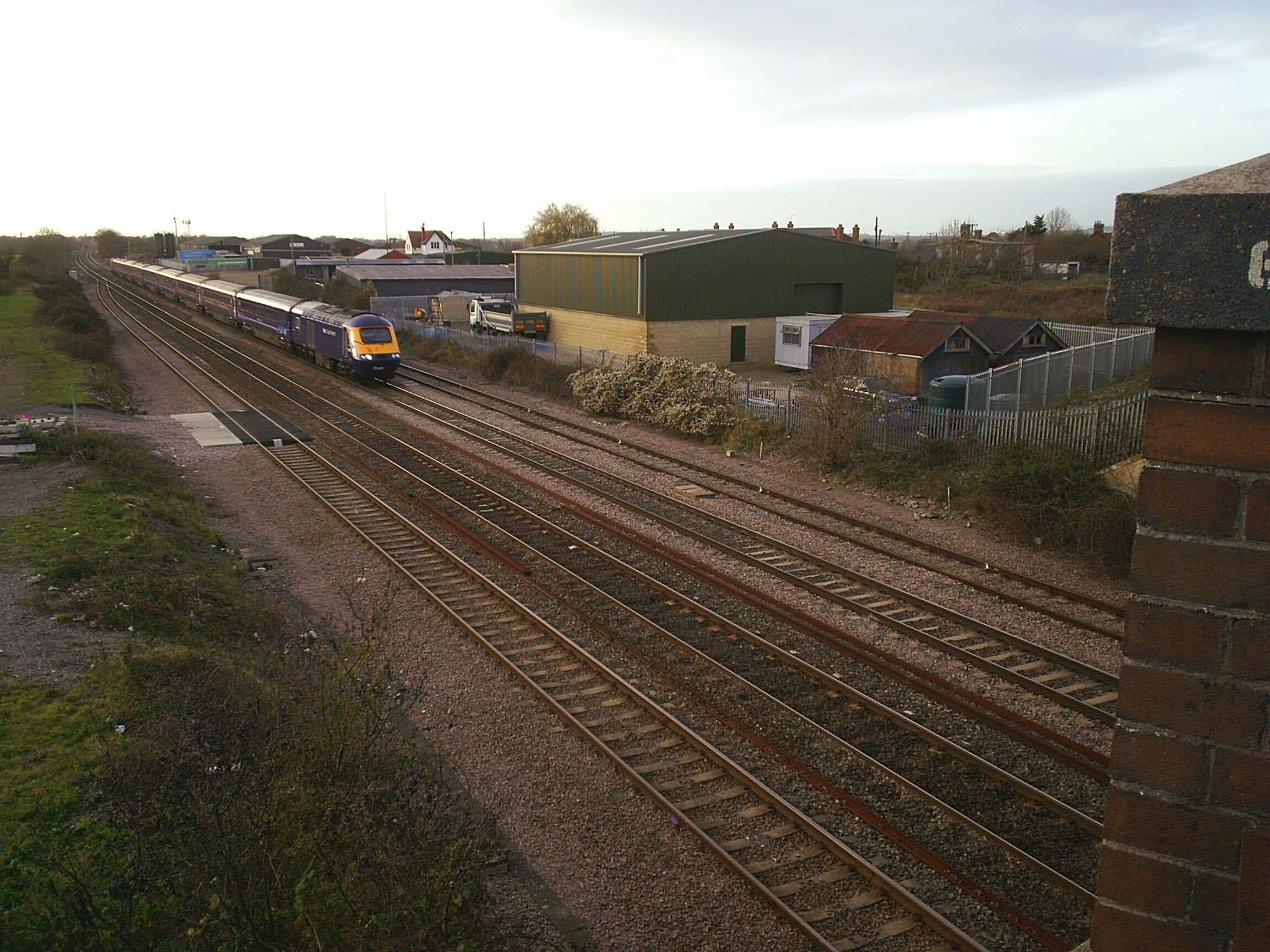
- Challow station in 2007, with little remaining of the original station

General information
- Location: West Challow, District of Vale of White Horse; England
- Grid reference: SU355905
- Platforms: 2

Other information
- Status: Disused

History
- Original company: Great Western Railway
- Pre-grouping: Great Western Railway
- Post-grouping: GWR; Western Region of British Railways

Key dates
- 20 July 1840: Opened as Faringdon Road
- 1 June 1864: Renamed Challow
- 1932: Rebuilt
- 7 December 1964: Closed to passengers
- 29 March 1965: Closed to freight
Location

Challow railway station is a former railway station about 2 miles (3 km) south of Stanford in the Vale on the A417 road between Wantage and Faringdon. It is named after the villages of West Challow and East Challow, which are 1 1/2 miles (2.4 km) and 2 1/2 miles (4 km) southeast of the former station.

== History ==
When the Great Western Railway's main line was extended from Reading through the Vale of White Horse in 1840, Faringdon Road station was opened. After the Faringdon Railway between Uffington and Faringdon opened in 1864, the GWR renamed Faringdon Road "Challow" to avoid confusion.

The main station buildings and goods yard were on the up side of the line. A loading dock was provided. The line was originally double track. In 1932, the line was quadrupled between Challow and Wantage Road. The 1840-built timber station building on the up side was demolished, replaced by a new brick building. The 1873-built signal box on the down side of the line was also demolished and replaced by a new building. The down side platform was demolished and rebuilt to allow four tracks to run through the station, two fast straddled by two slow, designated Main and Relief. The station's platforms were on the slow lines, with the down platform having a "Pagoda" building, apparently for use as a waiting room. A loading dock was provided at the Uffington end of the down platform. In the goods yard, a grounded coach body served as a Methodist Church from the 1930s.

On 7 December 1964 British Railways withdrew passenger services from Challow and all other intermediate stations between Didcot and Swindon. The last passenger train ran on 5 December. The station closed to freight traffic on 29 March 1965. The signal box closed on 30 May 1965. The goods shed was demolished the next month.

== Accidents and incidents ==
- On 25 October 1840, a train overran the end of the line, due to the driver being asleep at controls.
- On 4 September 1876, a postal train struck a log which was being loaded onto a wagon and was foul of the running line. The locomotive of the postal train was severely damaged, its smokebox door ending up in the goods yard.
- On 1 November 1962, a freight train was derailed whilst being shunted, blocking all four lines through the station.
- In late November 1962, A Hall Class locomotive and a wagon were derailed in a shunting accident.
- On 21 October 2021, a passenger train operated by Class 800 diesel-electric multiple unit 800301 struck a platelayer's trolley that had been left on the line near the site of Challow Station.

== The station today ==
Few parts of the station survive. The northern platform has almost disappeared completely and the southern platform is used by Network Rail, although no buildings remain and the buildings used by Network Rail are only small portable cabins, including a relay room. New buildings have been built around the site. The most noticeable is the builders' merchants on the site of the northern platform. One nearby public house, the Prince of Wales, was burnt down in 1999 and the site has been levelled.

Freight trains now use the relief lines from between Challow and Wantage Road to wait for High Speed Trains to overtake them.

Preceding station	Historical railways	Following station
Wantage Road; Line open, station closed	British Rail; Western Region; Great Western Main Line	Uffington; Line open, station closed
