= Uffington railway station =

Former railway station in England

Coordinates: 51.6121°N 1.5507°W

Uffington

General information
- Location: Uffington, District of Vale of White Horse; England
- Grid reference: SU312904
- Platforms: 3

Other information
- Status: Disused

History
- Original company: Great Western Railway
- Pre-grouping: GWR
- Post-grouping: GWR; Western Region of British Railways

Key dates
- 17 December 1840: GWR opened Faringdon Road to Hay Lane
- 1 June 1864: Uffington station opened; Faringdon Railway opened
- 7 December 1964: Station closed
Location

Uffington railway station (sometimes marked as Uffington Junction) is a former station on the Great Western Main Line. The station was located north-east of the village of Uffington, on the east side of the road between Fernham and Baulking.

In 1864 Uffington became a junction as the Faringdon Railway opened between there and the town of Faringdon. In 1886 the GWR took over the Faringdon Railway.

The station closed in 1964 and the station was demolished the following year. The signal box was closed in 1968

Preceding station	Historical railways	Following station
Challow; Line open, station closed	British Rail; Western Region; Great Western Main Line	Shrivenham; Line open, station closed
	Disused railways	
Faringdon; Line and station closed	British Rail; Western Region; Faringdon Branch Line	Terminus
