= Woolstone, Oxfordshire =

Village in Oxfordshire, England

Coordinates: 51.587°N 1.577°W

Woolstone
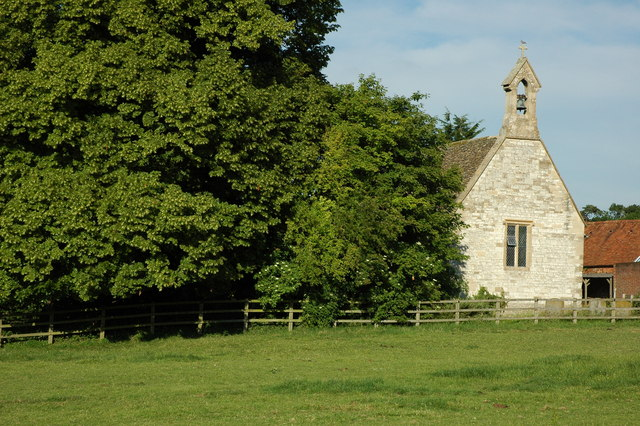
- All Saints' parish church

- Location within Oxfordshire
- Population: 210 (2011 Census)
- OS grid reference: SU2987
- Civil parish: Woolstone
- District: Vale of White Horse
- Shire county: Oxfordshire
- Region: South East
- Country: England
- Sovereign state: United Kingdom
- Post town: Faringdon
- Postcode district: SN7
- Dialling code: 01367
- Police: Thames Valley
- Fire: Oxfordshire
- Ambulance: South Central
- UK Parliament: Didcot and Wantage
- Website: Woolstone Village

Woolstone is a village and civil parish about 4 1/2 miles (7 km) south of Faringdon in the Vale of White Horse. Woolstone was part of Berkshire until the 1974 boundary changes transferred it to Oxfordshire. The 2011 Census recorded the parish population as 210.

== Geography ==
The village is a spring line settlement at the foot of the Berkshire Downs. Woolstone Wells are a group of springs in the chalk escarpment less than 1/2 mile (800 m) south of the village. A stream flows north from the springs past the village of Uffington and joins the River Ock about 2 miles (3 km) north of Woolstone village. Woolstone parish is long and thin, embracing both low-lying land in the vale and upland pasture on the downs. The parish extends just over 4 miles (6.4 km) north – south but is slightly less than 1 mile (1.6 km) wide at its widest point.

== Archaeology ==
The Ridgeway runs east–west through the parish along the top of the chalk escarpment just over 1 mile (1.6 km) south of the village. On Woolstone Down about 2 miles (3 km) south of the village are a disc barrow about 50 feet (15 m) in diameter and two bowl barrows. About 1/2 mile (800 m) south of the barrows is an ancient field system. Iron Age pottery has been found just west of Woolstone village. Steam ploughing in 1884 revealed remains of a Roman villa built of clunch in a field just west of Woolstone village.

Members of the Oxfordshire Architectural and Historical Society visited the site in 1884, found the south wall of the villa was at least 110 feet (34 m) long and there were Roman mosaics in two central rooms of the villa. The villa was excavated again in 1955. No permanent marker of the site was left after either excavation, but a geophysical survey tentatively identified what may be the site in 2007. The 1884 excavation found three human skeletons in the corridor of the Roman villa. The OAHS archaeologists took these to be Saxon burials.

== Toponymy ==
The Domesday Book of 1086 records the name as Olvricestone or Olvrichestone. Entries in the Book of Fees for 1242 record it as Wulfricheston and Wulvricheston. Other 13th-century spellings include Wulwricheston, Wluricheston and Wulevycheston. It evolved into Wlfricheston and Woulricheston in the 14th century and Wolierston and Wolston in the 16th century before reaching its present form. The name is derived from Old English and means "Wulfric's tūn". Tūn is an Old English word for "fence" that came to mean "enclosure" or "homestead".

== Manor ==
The Domesday Book of 1086 records that the Bishop of Winchester held an estate at Woolstone assessed at ten hides. Its income was used to support the Benedictine St Swithun's Priory at Winchester. The manor of Woolstone was a property of the Priory by the 13th century and in 1308–09 it had a capital messuage that included a lord's chamber, kitchen, stable, garden and dovecot. The Priory surrendered its all property to the Crown in the Dissolution of the Monasteries in 1539. The Crown granted Woolstone to Sir Thomas Seymour, who after the death of Henry VIII was created 1st Baron Seymour of Sudeley. However, in 1549 Seymour was executed for treason and attainted so all his properties reverted to the Crown.

In 1551 the Crown granted Woolstone to the courtier Thomas Weldon, who in 1566 or 1567 left it to his son William. In about 1583 the manor passed from William Weldon to Edmund Wiseman, and it descended in the Wiseman family for several generations until some time after 1694. By 1712 the Wisemans had sold Woolstone to Bartholomew Tipping IV, a former High Sheriff of Berkshire. In 1798 Bartholomew Tipping VII, also a former High Sheriff of Berkshire, died childless and left the manor to his niece Mary Anne Wroughton and her husband Rev. Philip Wroughton. In 1814 the Wroughtons sold Woolstone to Viscount Uffington, who in 1825 succeeded as 2nd Earl of Craven. In 1921 William Craven, 5th Earl of Craven inherited the manor. South-east of All Saints' parish church are Manor Farm and a Georgian house of six bays with a hipped roof.

== Parish church ==
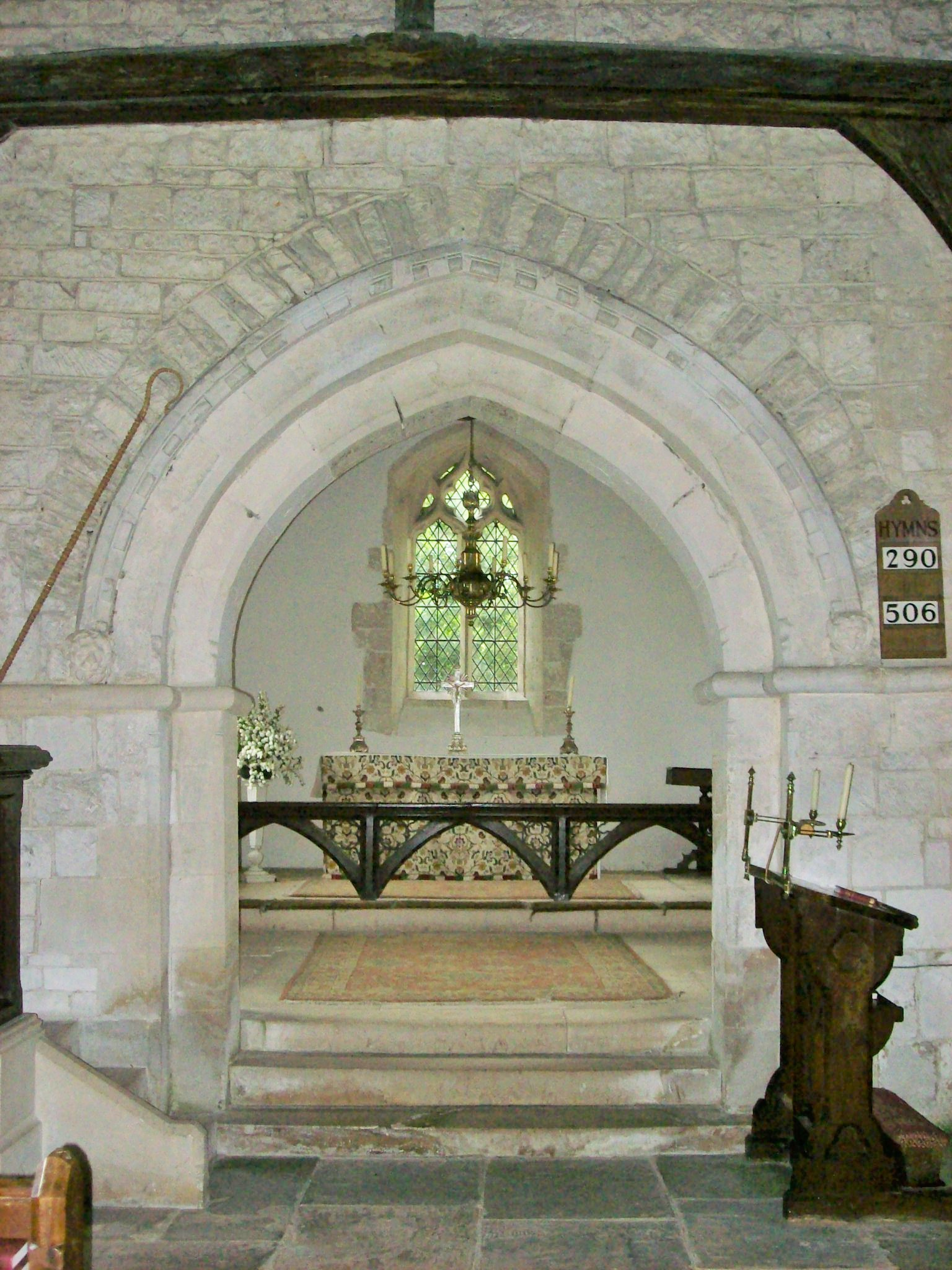
Chancel arch in All Saints' parish church

The Church of England parish church of All Saints was built in about 1195 as a dependent chapel of Uffington. The building is of chalk and clunch, with stone quoins. The north doorway is original late Norman, as are two lancet windows, one each on the north and south sides of the nave towards the west end. The chancel arch looks early 13th century. There is a south transept, whose arch and south window look late 13th century. Two north windows of the chancel are Decorated Gothic and one north window in the nave also appears to be early 14th century. The font is 14th century or later and is unusual in being a lead bowl mounted on a stone pillar.

In the 18th century the east wall of the chancel was rebuilt in brick with a single-light east window, and the west window of the nave was altered. In 1914 the east window was replaced with a new one of two lights. In 1783 the church had one bell. In the 19th or early in the 20th century the bellcote was replaced with the present one on the west gable of the nave. The church is a Grade II* listed building. Woolstone was made an ecclesiastical parish separate from Uffington in 1846. All Saints' is now once again part of the Uffington Benefice, along with the parishes of Baulking and Shellingford.

== Amenities ==
Woolstone has a 17th-century timber-framed public house, the White Horse Inn, that is controlled by Arkell's Brewery.

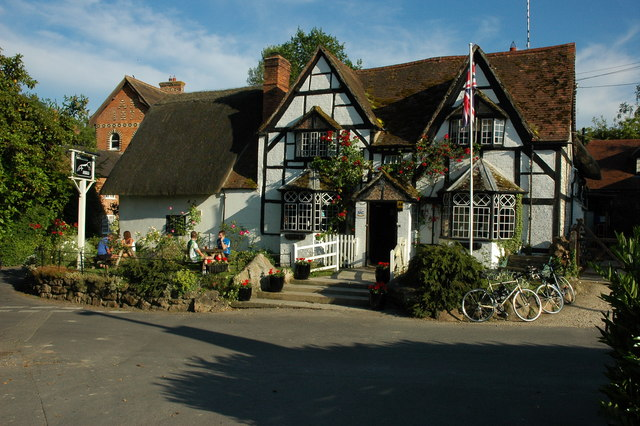
The White Horse Inn

== Economic and social history ==
A watermill at Woolstone is recorded in 1325. It was demolished in about 1850 and replaced with a house, Woolstone Lodge. The common lands of Uffington, Baulking and Woolstone were enclosed in 1776. In 1805–07 the Wilts & Berks Canal was extended eastwards from Longcot to Challow, passing through Woolstone parish about 1/2 mile (800 m) north of the village. The canal had a wharf at Uffington 1 mile (1.6 km) north of Woolstone. The Great Western Main Line was built through the northernmost part of the parish and opened in 1840. Thereafter the canal declined until 1901, when the Stanley Aqueduct over the River Marden in Wiltshire collapsed and the little remaining traffic virtually ceased. The route was formally abandoned in 1914. The Wilts & Berks Canal Trust is currently restoring the canal.

== Bibliography ==
- Dalby, LJ (2000) [1971]. The Wilts and Berks Canal (3rd ed.). Usk: Oakwood Press. p. 23. ISBN 0-85361-562-4.
- Ditchfield, PH; Page, William, eds. (1924). "Uffington". A History of the County of Berkshire. Victoria County History. Vol. IV. assisted by John Hautenville Cope. London: The St Katherine Press. pp. 543–551.
- Ekwall, Eilert (1960) [1936]. Concise Oxford Dictionary of English Place-Names (4th ed.). Oxford: Oxford University Press. Kingston. ISBN 0198691033.
- Pevsner, Nikolaus (1966). Berkshire. The Buildings of England. Harmondsworth: Penguin Books. p. 313.
- Wintle, William (April 2007). Geophysical Survey of a Roman Villa at Woolstone, Oxfordshire April 2007 (PDF). Oxford: William Wintle.
