= Grove, Oxfordshire =

Village in Oxfordshire, England

Coordinates: 51.612°N 1.421°W

Grove
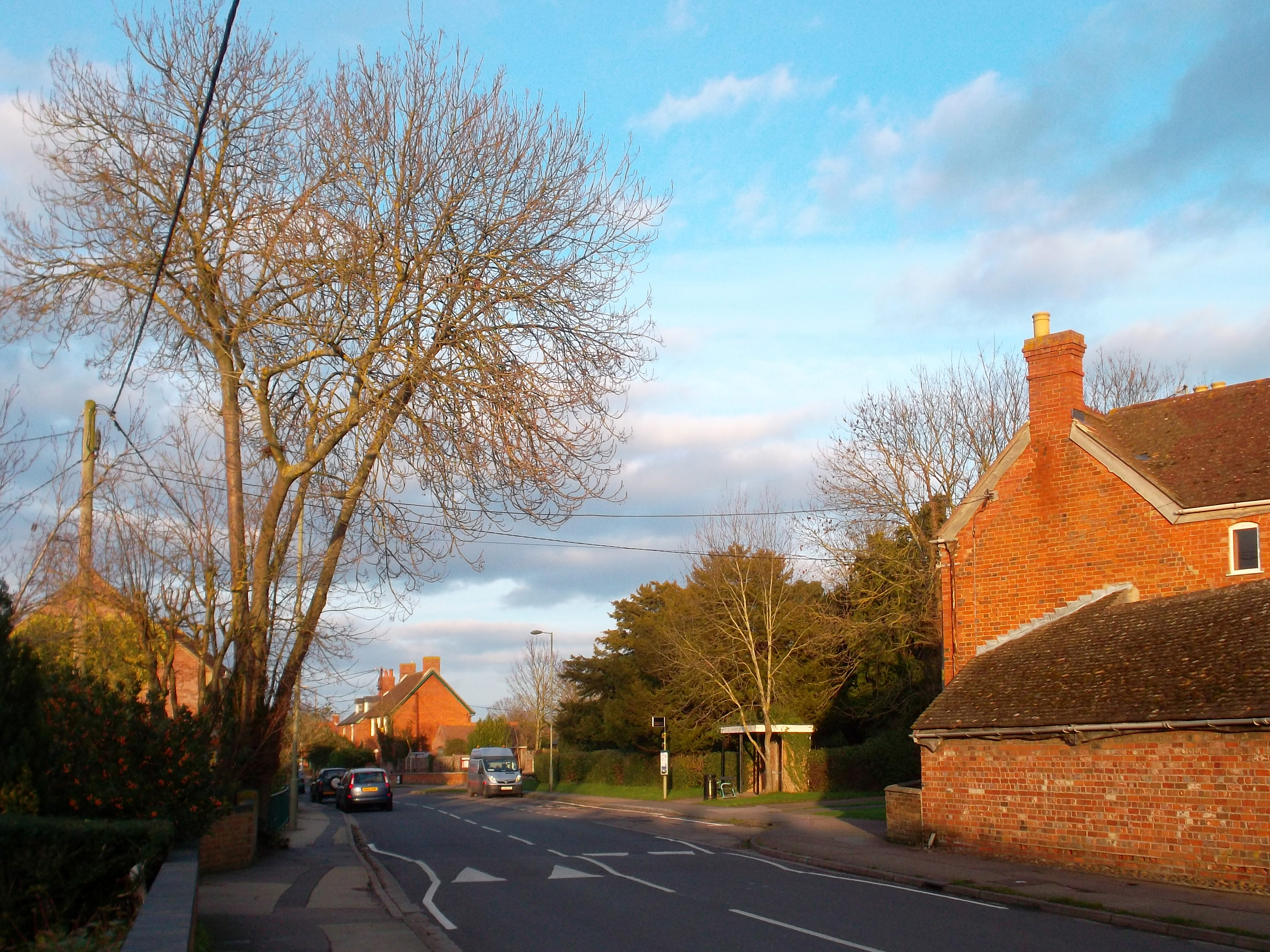
- Main Street, Grove

- Location within Oxfordshire
- Population: 8,336 (2021 census)
- OS grid reference: SU402905
- Civil parish: Grove
- District: Vale of White Horse
- Shire county: Oxfordshire
- Region: South East
- Country: England
- Sovereign state: United Kingdom
- Post town: Wantage
- Postcode district: OX12
- Dialling code: 01235
- Police: Thames Valley
- Fire: Oxfordshire
- Ambulance: South Central
- UK Parliament: Didcot and Wantage
- Website: Parish Council

Grove is a village and civil parish in Oxfordshire, England. The village is on Letcombe Brook, about 1 1/2 miles (2.4 km) north of Wantage and 14 miles (23 km) south-west of Oxford. The 2021 Census recorded the parish's population as 8,336. It is home to Formula One constructor Williams Racing.

== History ==
The remains of a large Roman villa have recently been found near the village.

In 1622 Thomas Grove had a watermill at Grove. Grove Farmhouse is dated 1684. It is a chequer brick building of three bays and its doorway has bolection moulding. The common lands of Wantage and Grove were enclosed by an Act of Parliament passed in 1803. The land awards under the Act seem to have been made in 1806. In 1770 the turnpike road was built as a more direct route between Wantage and Oxford. Between 1796 and 1810 the Wilts & Berks Canal was built; its main route passed through the village, and a branch of the canal was built between Grove and Wantage.

In 1840, the Great Western Railway opened Wantage Road station on the northern boundary of Grove. In 1875, the Wantage Tramway was built. This was a single track laid alongside the turnpike road linking Wantage Road Station and Wantage. It was operated by steam tram locomotives which pulled both a passenger tramcar and goods wagons. Competition from the railway and tramway reduced canal traffic, and the Wilts & Berks fell into disuse in 1901. Increasing competition from road transport reduced traffic on the tram, and passenger tram services were ended in 1925. Parts of the Wilts & Berks Canal around Grove are still visible, providing some local walks. The Wilts & Berks Canal Trust is working to reopen the entire canal, and several small sections around Grove have already been restored. In 1965, British Rail closed Wantage Road station. Oxfordshire County Council has a policy to seek a new station to be built to serve Wantage and Grove.

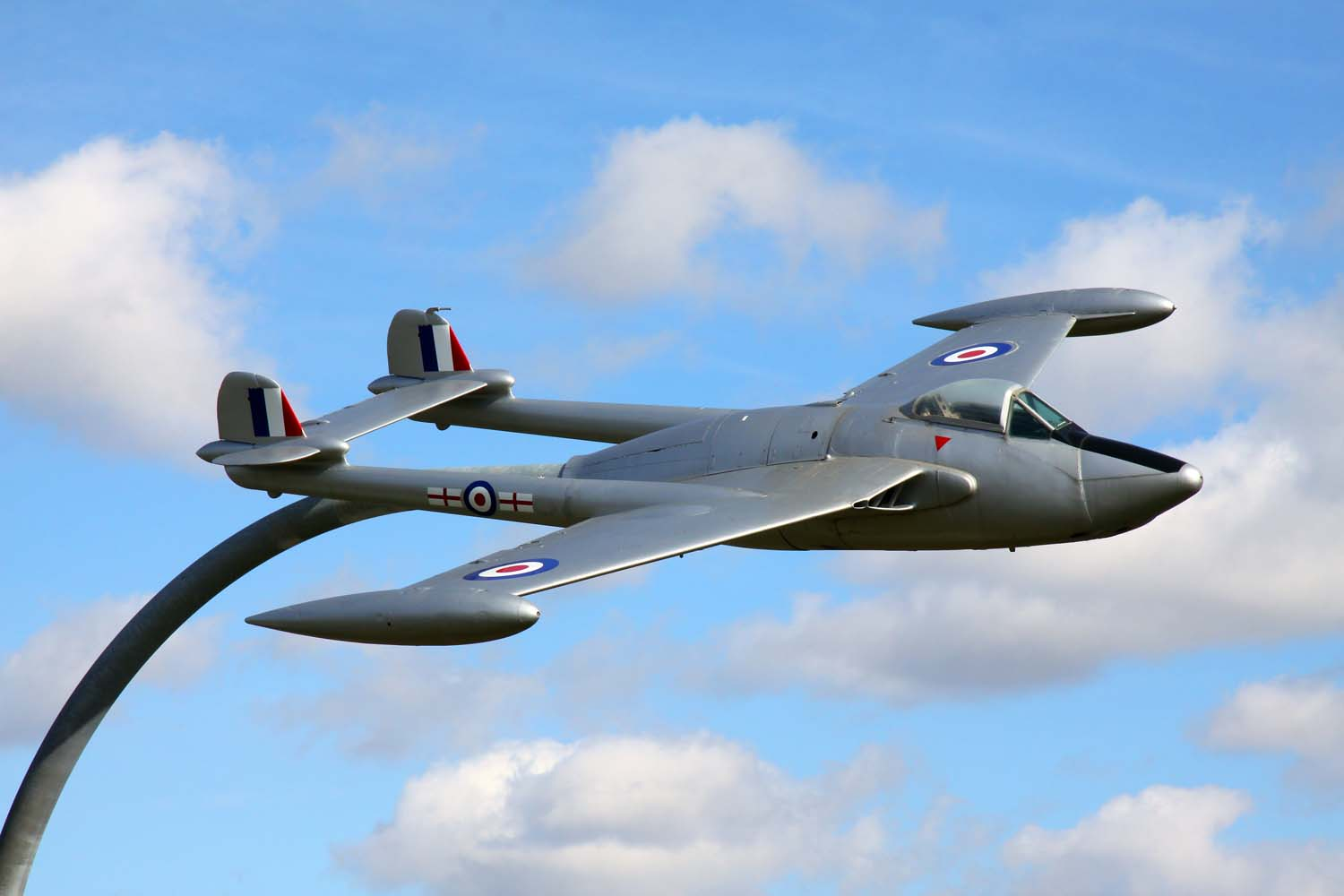
De Havilland Venom aircraft, formerly on static display at Grove Technology Park, previously RAF Grove

In 1942, RAF Grove was opened as a Bomber Command training base. In 1943 it was transferred to the United States Army Air Forces and the 45th Air Depot Group established one of the largest and busiest supply airfields in Europe. In 1946 the USAAF returned the airfield to the RAF, who relegated it for non-flying operations. In 1955 the station was transferred to the United Kingdom Atomic Energy Authority, which used it until the 1960s. The site was then sold off and private housing was built on part of the former airfield.

In 1945, the Wantage Tramway closed to freight traffic. One of its steam tram engines is preserved at Didcot Railway Centre. Grove has lately been a site of extensive housing development, greatly increasing its size and almost merging with the nearby town of Wantage. Grove is now the largest village in the Vale of White Horse.

A De Havilland Venom fighter-bomber used to be displayed on a pylon outside Grove Technology Park. In February 2022 Storm Eunice broke the pylon, and the aircraft was destroyed when it hit the ground.

== Parish churches ==
King Stephen granted land at Grove to the Benedictine Abbey of Bermondsey in 1142. Grove is said to have had a chapel of St. John the Baptist until it was destroyed in 1733. It would have been a chapelry of the ecclesiastical parish of Wantage, of which Grove was a part until the 1830s. The font is an 18th-century wooden one brought from All Saints' parish church, Pusey. A new Church of England parish church was built in 1832 and Grove was made into a separate ecclesiastical parish in 1835.

The 1832 building was replaced by a new parish church of St. James the Great, built in 1900 or 1901. St. James' was a Gothic Revival building in an Early English Gothic style with six bays and a south aisle. It was designed by P.A. Robson, son of the architect Edward Robert Robson. In the 1960s Sir Nikolaus Pevsner found St. James' to be derelict. In the 1960s a new parish church of St. John the Baptist was built to replace St. James'. The foundation stone is dated 1965. It incorporates items from St. James' including the font, a stained glass window depicting St. James and a panel listing successive vicars of the parish.

== Transport ==
The A338 road passes through the parish, along the east side of the village. To the north, the A338 links Grove with the A420 at Besselsleigh, west of Oxford. To the south, the A338 links Grove to Wantage, Hungerford, and junction 14 of the M4 motorway.

Stagecoach West and Thames Travel operates buses to Oxford, Abingdon, Didcot, Milton Park, Harwell Campus and Wantage. Night buses served Oxford and Wantage. The nearest railway station is Didcot Parkway, about 8 miles (13 km) east of Grove. The station can be reached by road, and bus services provide a direct link to the station.

== Amenities ==
Grove has two primary schools:

- Millbrook Primary School.
- Grove Church of England Primary School.

Grove has three public houses:

- The Baytree, Denchworth Road
- The Bell, Main Street
- The Volunteer Inn, Station Road

== Sports and leisure ==
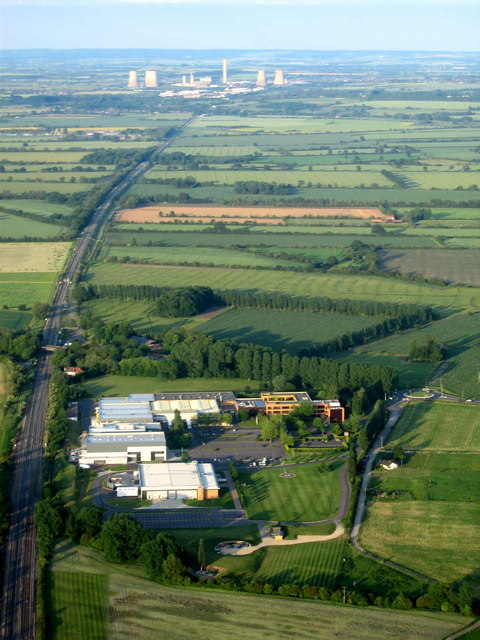
Aerial view with the Williams F1 base in the foreground, looking east to Didcot power stations

Since 1996, Grove has been the home to Formula One team and constructor Williams Racing, who moved from their original factory in Didcot. Williams won the World Constructors’ Championship in the 1996 and 1997 seasons, with Damon Hill winning the World Drivers’ Championship in 1996 and Jacques Villeneuve in 1997. As well as the factory, the Williams base also features an Experience Centre which includes tours, a museum and hands-on activities. The centre also hosts race day hospitality for fans.

Grove rugby union and association football clubs play at the Cane Lane parish recreation ground on the outskirts of the village. Grove Rugby Football Club was founded in 1971 and plays in the Southern League, North division. The Club fields four senior sides, including veterans. Grove RFC has a youth section, across twelve mini (mixed, under–7 to under–12) and junior groups (under–13 to under–18; including two girls' teams, under–15 and under–18). One of its alumni is Jon Dunbar, who captained Grove in the early 2000s before moving to Newcastle Falcons and then Leeds Tykes/Leeds Carnegie on a professional contract. Grove Challengers F.C., the local association football junior side, was founded in 1971. The club is open to children aged 5–17, and teams play in the Oxford Youth Football League.

A free weekly 5K Parkrun takes place in Grove. Every Saturday morning the event is held on a multi-lap course of the Grove fields and recreation grounds.

== Twinning ==
Grove is twinned with Mably, France, since 1990.

== Sources ==
- Page, W.H.; Ditchfield, P.H., eds. (1924). A History of the County of Berkshire. Victoria County History. Vol. 4. assisted by John Hautenville Cope. London: The St Katherine Press. pp. 319–332.
- Pevsner, Nikolaus (1966). Berkshire. The Buildings of England. Harmondsworth: Penguin Books. p. 150.
