= Shannon (locomotive) =

Preserved steam locomotive

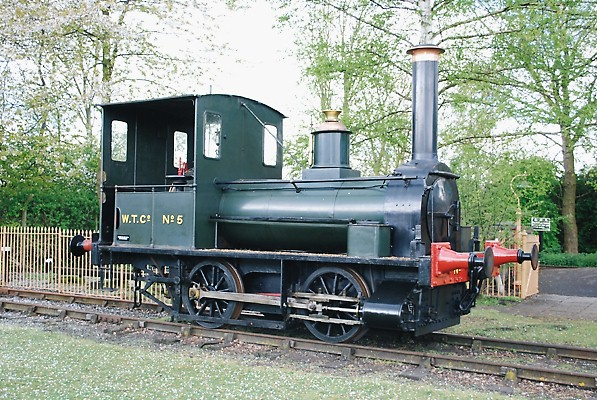
- Shannon at Didcot in 2011
Type and origin
- Power type: Steam
- Builder: George England and Co.
- Build date: 1857
Specifications
- Configuration
  - Whyte: 0-4-0WT
  - UIC: 1'B
- Gauge: 4 ft 8 1/2 in (1,435 mm)
- Driver dia.: 2 ft 11 in (0.889 m)
- Loco weight: 15 long tons (175,600 lb or 79.7 t)
- Boiler pressure: 120 psi (0.83 MPa)
- Cylinders: Two, outside
- Cylinder size: 9 in × 12 in (229 mm × 305 mm)
Performance figures
- Tractive effort: 2,500 lbf (11.1 kN) @75% boiler pressure
Career
- Locale: Great Britain
- Withdrawn: 1945
- Disposition: Currently preserved at Didcot

Shannon is a steam locomotive, built in 1857 by George England and Co. for the Sandy and Potton Railway and is now preserved at the Didcot Railway Centre.

== History ==
The locomotive was built in 1857 by George England and Co. of New Cross for the Sandy and Potton Railway, at a cost of £800. The railway was promoted by Captain Sir William Peel VC, whose estate lay between those towns, and the locomotive was named after his ship, the frigate HMS Shannon. In 1862 it was sold to the London and North Western Railway (LNWR) for shunting at Crewe Works and numbered 1104. The LNWR also briefly trialled it on the Cromford and High Peak Railway. It was renumbered 1863 in 1872.

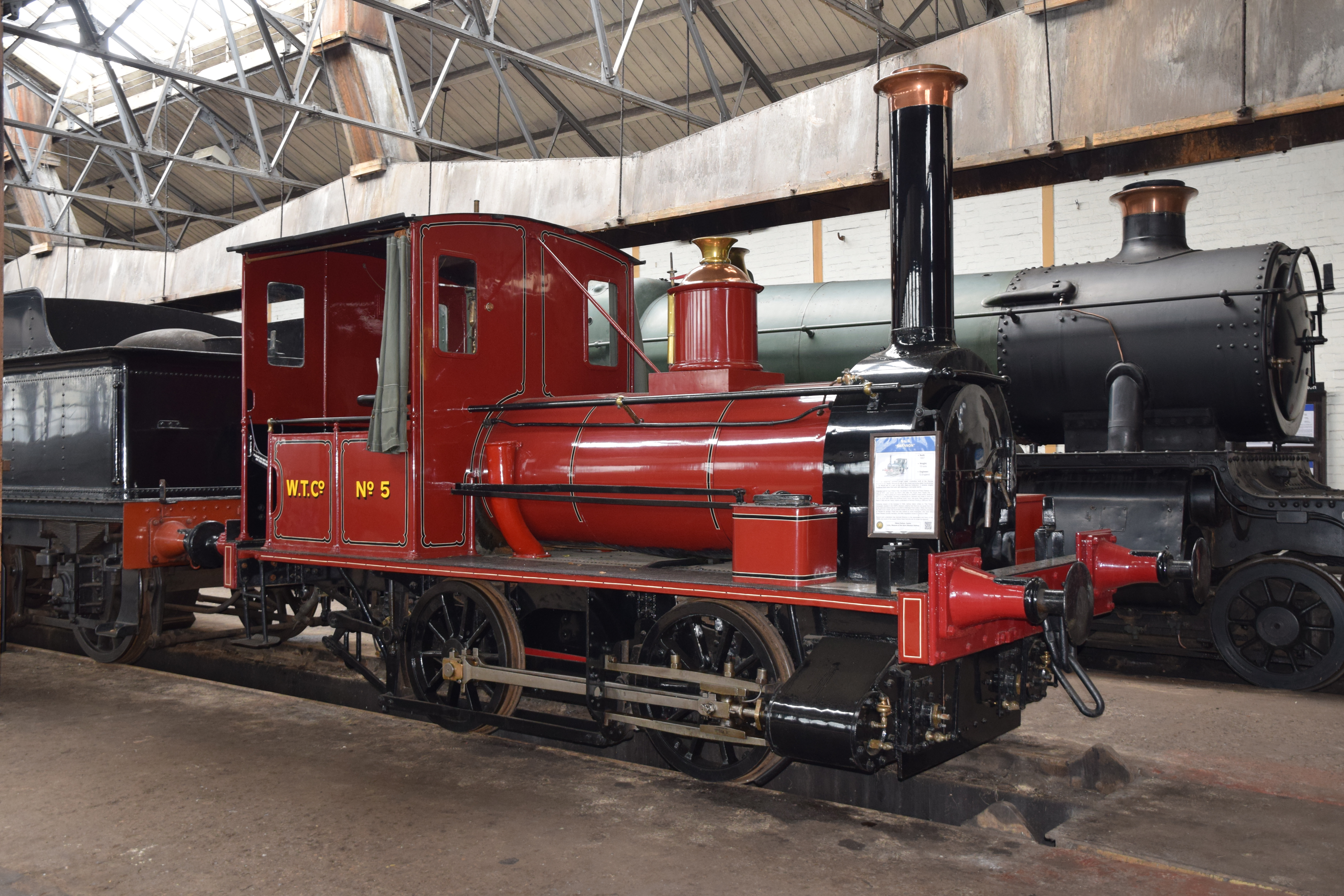
Shannon at Didcot Railway Centre in 2021

In 1878 it was sold to the Wantage Tramway for £365 8s 1d where it became No 5, and was known as 'Jane' although the name was never actually carried. It was initially fitted with full tramway skirts, but these were removed after a few years. After closure of the tramway in 1945 it was purchased for £100 by the Great Western Railway and the name 'Shannon' was reapplied. It was preserved as a static exhibit on Wantage Road railway station until that closed in 1964. In 1965 it was stored on the premises of the Atomic Energy Authority, but in 1969 it was moved to the Didcot Railway Centre, where it was finally steamed and operated again in October 1969.

No. 5 Shannon is part of the UK National Collection of railway locomotives (Object No.1978-7013). In 1975 it took part in the 150th anniversary celebrations of the Stockton and Darlington Railway in steam, but had to be retired soon afterwards due to a crack in the firebox tubeplate.

When first restored at Didcot, No. 5 was painted in Great Western Railway colours, which is how it appeared on the tramway following repair at Swindon in the 1930s. This also accounts for several GWR fittings on the locomotive. More recently, it has been repainted in lined maroon, in an approximation of the first livery carried when on the tramway.

== See also ==
- List of rolling stock items in the UK National Collection
