= Tom Brown's School Museum =

The Uffington Museum
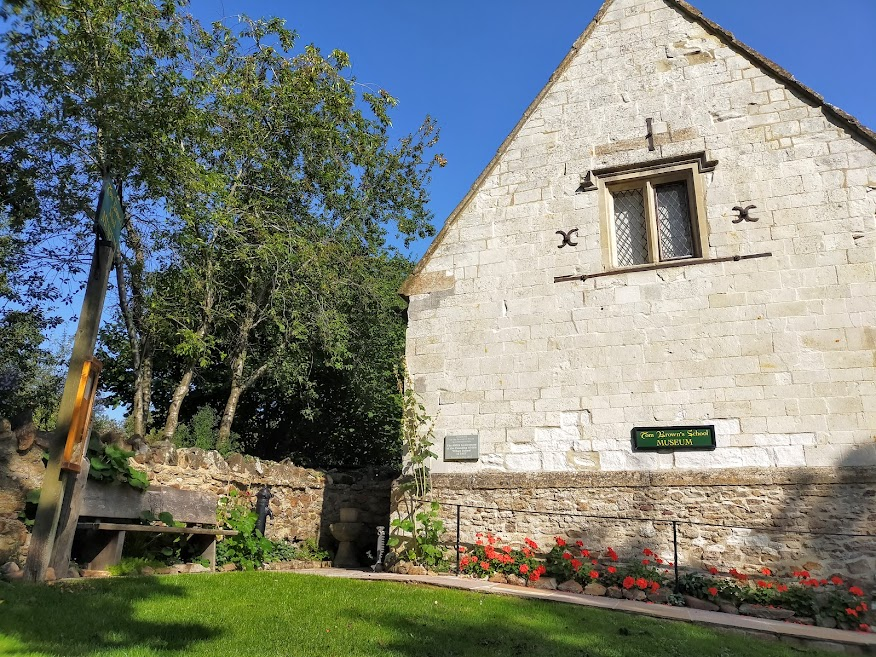
- View of Tom Brown's School Museum

- Location within Oxfordshire Location within England
- Established: 1984
- Location: Uffington, Oxfordshire, England
- Coordinates: 51.6012°N 1.5651°W
- Type: Local museum
- Founder: John Little
- Curator: Garry Gibbons
- Website: uffingtonmuseum.co.uk

Tom Brown's School Museum is a local museum in the village of Uffington (near Faringdon), Oxfordshire, England. It was opened in 1984.

The museum covers local history, archaeology, the author Thomas Hughes (1822–1896, author of Tom Brown's School Days), the poet laureate Sir John Betjeman (1906–1984, who lived in the village), and the nearby ancient Uffington White Horse. The museum is close to the churchyard and is housed in a 17th-century schoolroom that was featured in the novel Tom Brown's School Days.

== See also ==
- List of museums in Oxfordshire
- Museum of Oxford
