= Battle of Faringdon =

There were two battles of Faringdon:

- An 1145 battle between Stephen, King of England and Empress Matilda forces
- A 1645 battle in Faringdon, Oxfordshire, as part of the English Civil War
