= Uffington, Oxfordshire =

Village in Oxfordshire, England

Coordinates: 51.61°N 1.56°W

Uffington
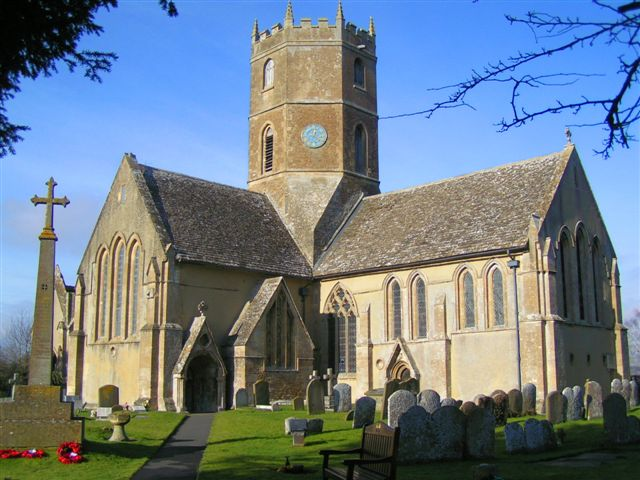
- St Mary's parish church

- Location within Oxfordshire
- Population: 783 (2011 Census)
- OS grid reference: SU3089
- Civil parish: Uffington
- District: Vale of White Horse
- Shire county: Oxfordshire
- Region: South East
- Country: England
- Sovereign state: United Kingdom
- Post town: Faringdon
- Postcode district: SN7
- Dialling code: 01367
- Police: Thames Valley
- Fire: Oxfordshire
- Ambulance: South Central
- UK Parliament: Didcot and Wantage
- Website: Uffington.net

Uffington is a village and civil parish in Oxfordshire, about 4 miles (6.4 km) south of Faringdon and 6 miles (10 km) west of Wantage. The 2011 Census recorded the parish's population as 783. Lying within the historic county boundaries of Berkshire, in 1974 it was transferred for local government purposes to Oxfordshire under the Local Government Act 1972. Uffington is most commonly known for the Uffington White Horse hill figure on the Berkshire Downs in the south of the parish.

== Geography and character ==
The village is about 1 mile (1.6 km) north of the foot of the Berkshire Downs escarpment and 1 1/4 miles (2 km) north of the B4507 road that links Wantage and Ashbury. Its older houses are built of chalk blocks and thatched. The parish church is nicknamed "The Cathedral of the Vale". The village is in the middle of the Vale of White Horse, which is the valley of the River Ock. Like a number of parishes in the Vale, Uffington parish is long and thin, running north–south, so that it includes both low-lying arable land and grazing upland on the Berkshire Downs.

It measures about 4 1/2 miles (7 km) north – south, and almost 1 1/2 miles (2.4 km) east – west at its widest point. In 1924 its area was 6,451 acres (2,611 ha). The parish formerly included Baulking and Woolstone. The River Ock forms most of the northern boundary of the parish. The western boundary crosses Dragon Hill, White Horse Hill, Uffington Down and the gallops on Woolstone Down. The eastern boundary crosses Kingston Warren Down and Ram's Hill, almost to Fawler and partly along Stutfield Brook.

== Archaeology ==
The White Horse is one of the United Kingdom's best-known archaeological sites. It is a 374 feet (114 m) long Bronze Age hill figure, cut out of the turf on White Horse Hill on the Berkshire Downs just south of the village of Woolstone. It is generally thought to have been a Celtic religious totem, associated with the people who were later called the Atrebates. The white horse may have been associated with the adjoining Dragon Hill, a small natural hillock with an artificially flattened top.

Above these stands Uffington Castle, an Iron Age hill fort (overlying a Bronze Age predecessor) where some of this tribe may have lived. There are also a number of associated burial mounds and there are others further south. Just south of the hill fort the Ridgeway passes through the parish. Ram's Hill seems to have been a Bronze Age cattle ranching and trading centre. Contrary to popular Victorian theories, the Battle of Ashdown in 871 was not fought at Uffington and the White Horse was not created as a monument by King Alfred's men.

== Place Names ==
The earliest known records of place names (toponym) are as Uffentun and Offentona in Anglo-Saxon charters from 931 now reproduced in the Cartularium Saxonicum. Another 10th- and 11th-century spelling was Offentune. The Domesday Book of 1086 records it as Offentone. Later spellings include Offinton in the 13th century, Uffinton in the 14th century and Offington in the 16th century. The name is derived from Old English and means "the tūn of Uffa's people". The word tūn originally meant "fence", but had come to mean an enclosure or homestead.

== Charter and Manors ==
Uffington is recorded in 10th-century boundary charters and in 931 Earl Æthelstan granted an estate at Uffington by seisin to Abingdon Abbey. The abbey held the manor throughout the Middle Ages. In 1291 King Edward I visited a nearby grange. In 1630 Elizabeth Craven, widow of Sir William Craven, bought the manors of Uffington and Compton from Sir Francis Jones. This began a 329-year connection between the Craven family and Uffington. St Mary's parish church suffered in the Civil War because of the Craven family's Royalism. The Earls of Craven lived at nearby Ashdown House.

== Parish church ==
The Church of England parish church of St Mary is cruciform in plan and was completed about 1250. The tower is mounted in the centre of the building rather than at one end, over the crossing between the nave, chancel and transepts, and (unusually) is octagonal (8-sided) in cross-section rather than square. Some of the present windows date from the 17th century. In the south transept is a Jacobean monument to John Saunders, who died in 1638. It has a semi-reclining effigy of Saunders set in a semi-circular coffered arch, with a large plaque surrounded by strapwork. St Mary's church is a Grade I listed building. Its parish is part of the Benefice of Uffington, Shellingford, Woolstone and Baulking.

The tower had a ring of five bells until 1992, when they were increased to six by the addition of a new treble bell. The five original bells were cast in 1657. In 1762 Thomas Rudhall of Gloucester recast the tenor bell and in 1770 Robert I Wells of Aldbourne, Wiltshire recast what is now the fifth bell. In 1803 James Wells, also of Aldbourne, recast what is now the second bell. Mears and Stainbank of the Whitechapel Bell Foundry recast the fourth bell in 1867 and the third bell in 1886. In 1992 an additional treble bell was added, cast by the Whitechapel Bell Foundry, making a total ring of six bells.

== Economic history ==
The common lands of Uffington, Baulking and Woolstone were enclosed in 1776. Between 1805 and 1807 the section of the Wilts & Berks Canal between Longcot and Challow was completed. It passes through the parish just north of the village. Uffington had its own wharf, just northwest of the village, where Wharf Farm now is. Traffic on the canal had virtually ceased by 1901 and the route was formally abandoned in 1914. The Wilts & Berks Canal Trust is currently restoring the canal. The Great Western Main Line was built through the parish in 1840, passing just over 1/2 mile (800 m) north of the village. In 1864 the Faringdon Railway was completed, joining the Great Western at a junction 1 mile (1.6 km) northeast of the village. Uffington railway station was opened at the junction. British Railways closed the station in 1964.

== Notable residents ==
- George Hughes (1821–1872), was born in the village. Played first-class cricket and was the basis of the literary character Tom Brown; brother of Thomas (see below).
- Thomas Hughes (1822–96), author of Tom Brown's Schooldays, was born in the village.
- The poet John Betjeman (1906–84) lived in the village in the 1930s. He was also a churchwarden of St Mary's church when it was converted from oil lamps to electricity and its royal arms were cleaned.

== Tom Brown's School Museum ==
The village school mentioned in the book "Tom Brown's Schooldays" is now Tom Brown's School Museum, with exhibits on Thomas Hughes, the Uffington White Horse, and other local subjects. A notice board outside the building includes the following history: The Old Schoolroom was founded in 1617 by Thomas Saunders, a wealthy merchant from Woolstone, with places for 12 "worthy boys" - 8 from Uffington and 4 from Woolstone. It is referenced in the well-known book "Tom Brown's Schooldays", written by Thomas Hughes who was born in Uffington in 1822. The building was used as a village reading room from 1872 until 1984 when it became the village museum, and has a collection of 137 editions of Tom Brown's Schooldays. 'John Betjeman.' The museum also has copies of correspondence by John Betjeman, our other village literary great, who lived in Uffington from 1934 to 1945. 'Uffington Village Hall.' This is named the Thomas Hughes Memorial Hall after the author of the book "Tom Brown's Schooldays".

== Amenities and events ==
Uffington has a pub, the Fox and Hounds. Uffington United Football Club plays in North Berks Football League Division Three. Uffington Cricket Club plays in Oxfordshire Cricket Association Division Four. Uffington also has a tennis club. The Uffington White Horse Show is held annually, with the profits being distributed for the benefit of the residents of Uffington, Baulking and Woolstone by a registered charity.

== Twin towns – sister cities ==
Uffington was twinned with Saint Paterne - Le Chevain for 25 years before being dissolved in 2016.

== Gallery ==
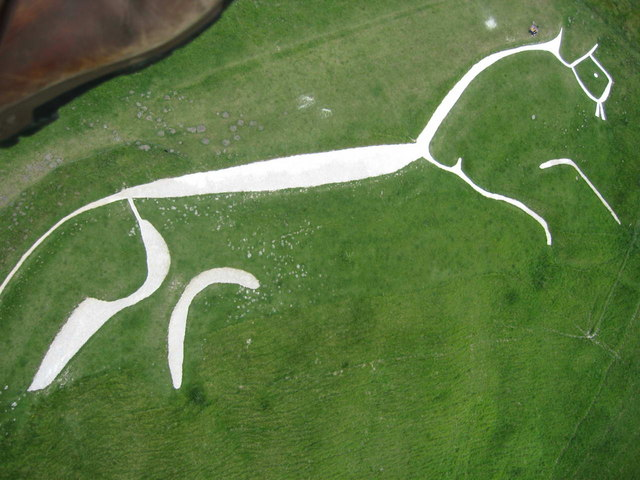
The White Horse seen from the air

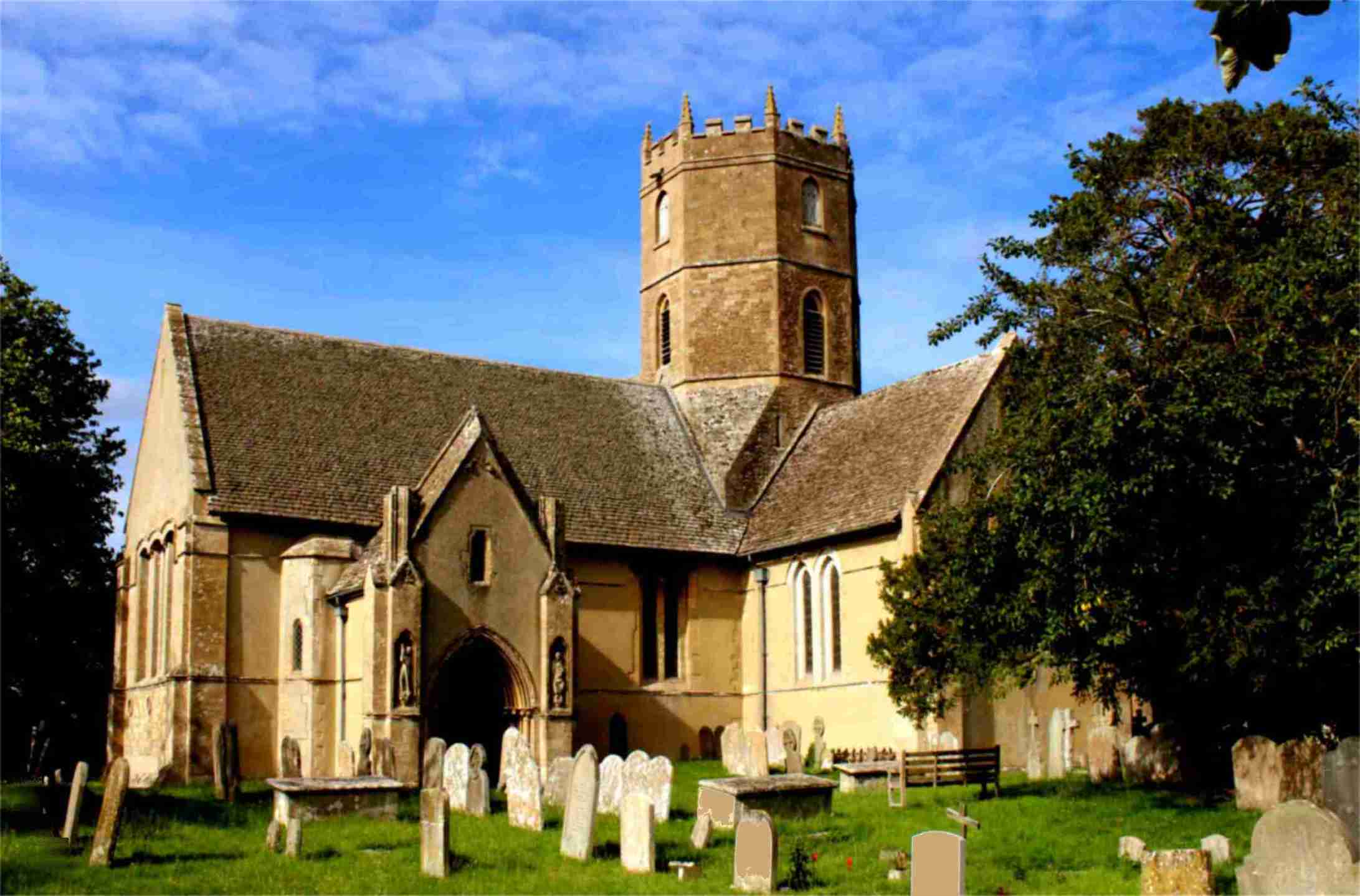
Uffington Church from the SE showing 6-sided central tower and side door in South transept

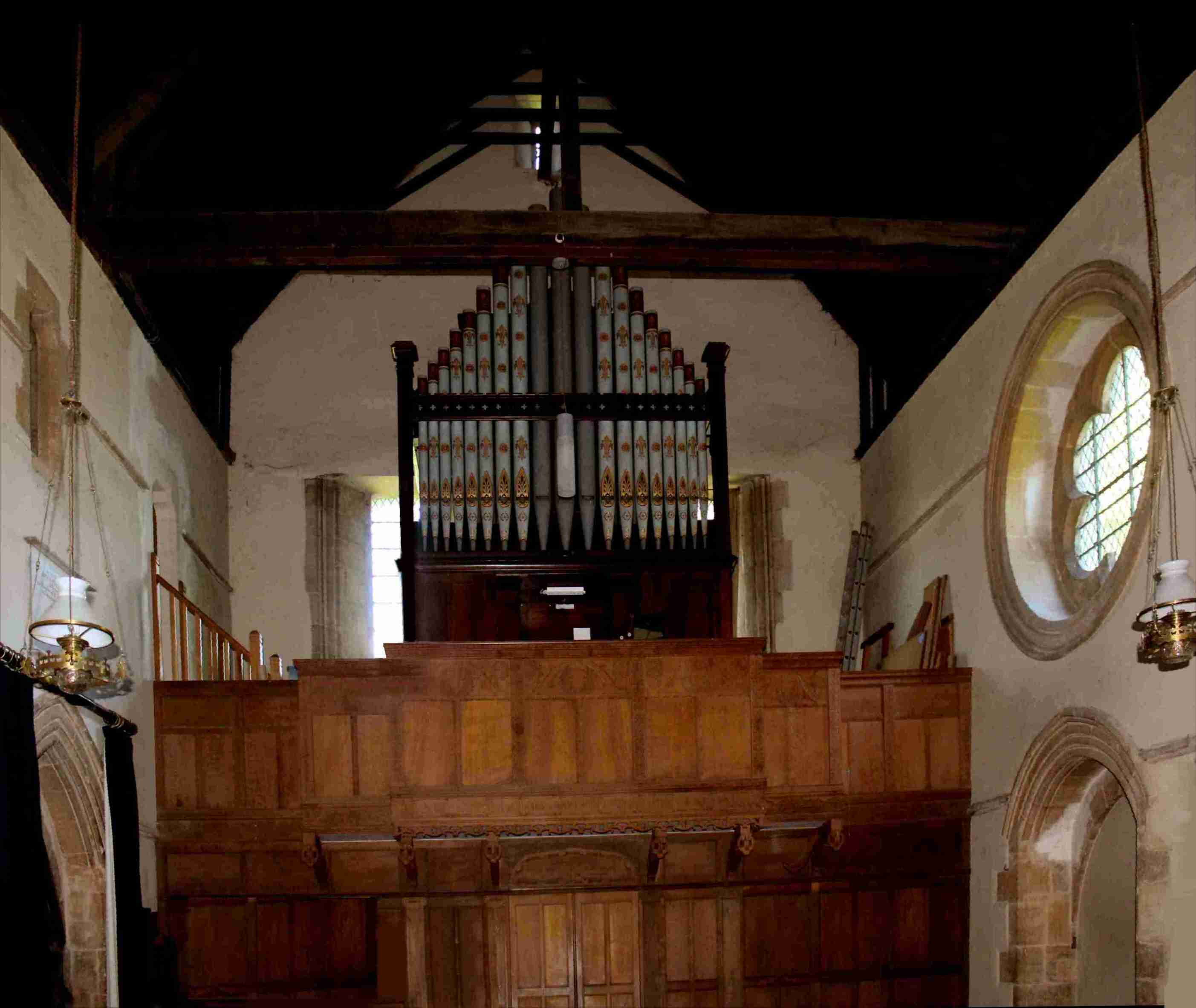
Uffington church inside looking west towards the organ

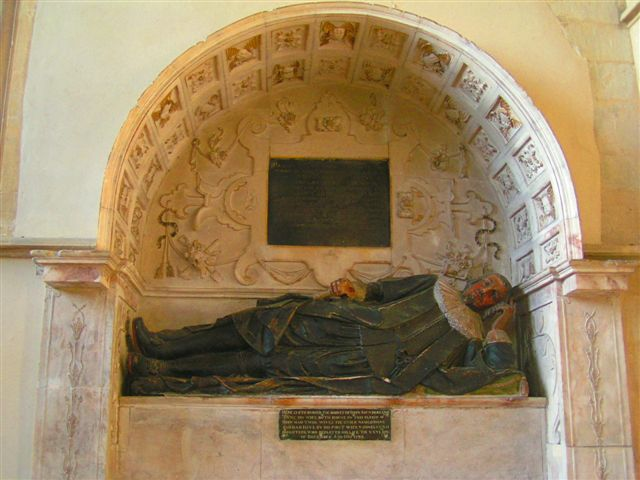
Grave of John Saunders in the South transept

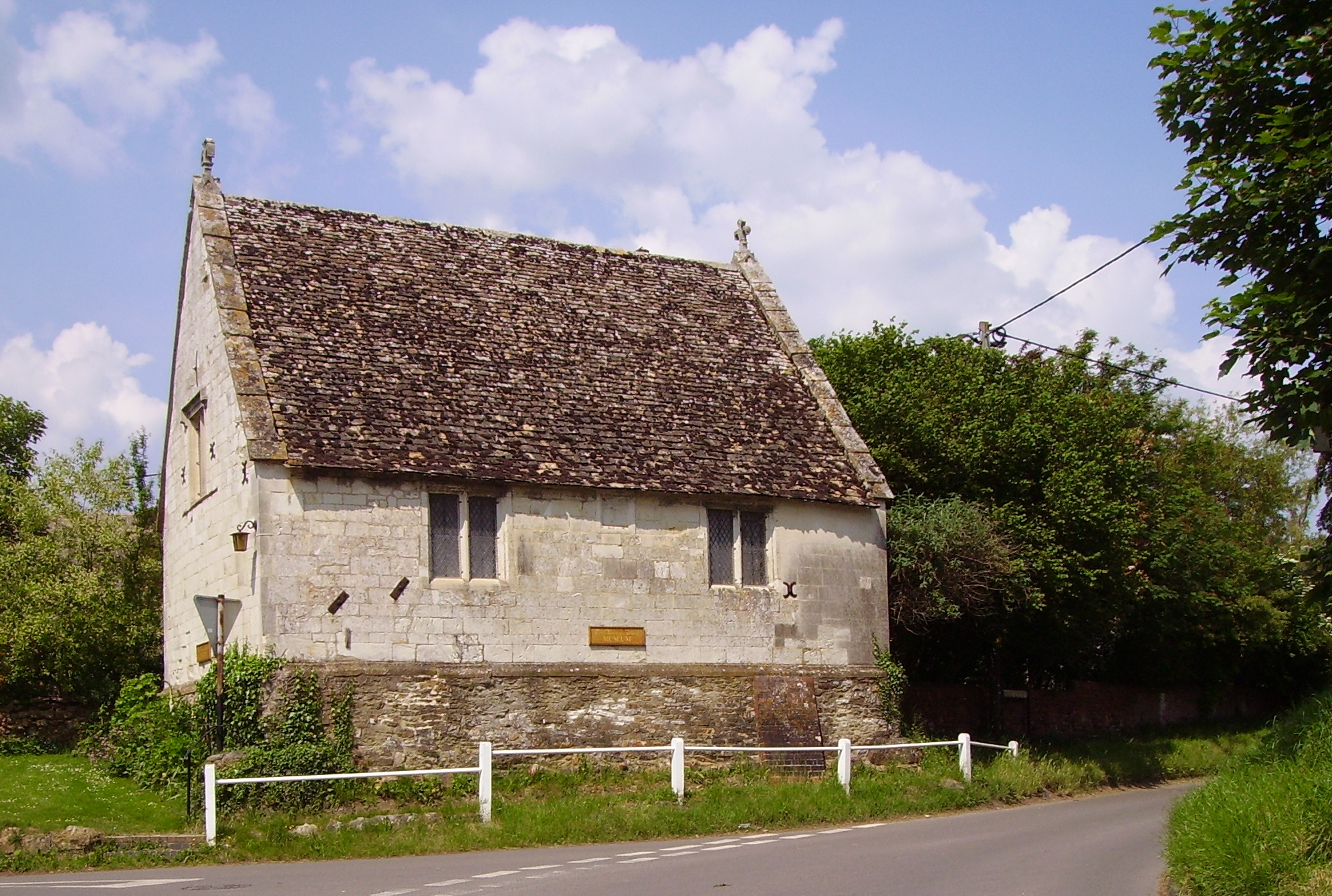
The Old School, now Tom Brown's School Museum

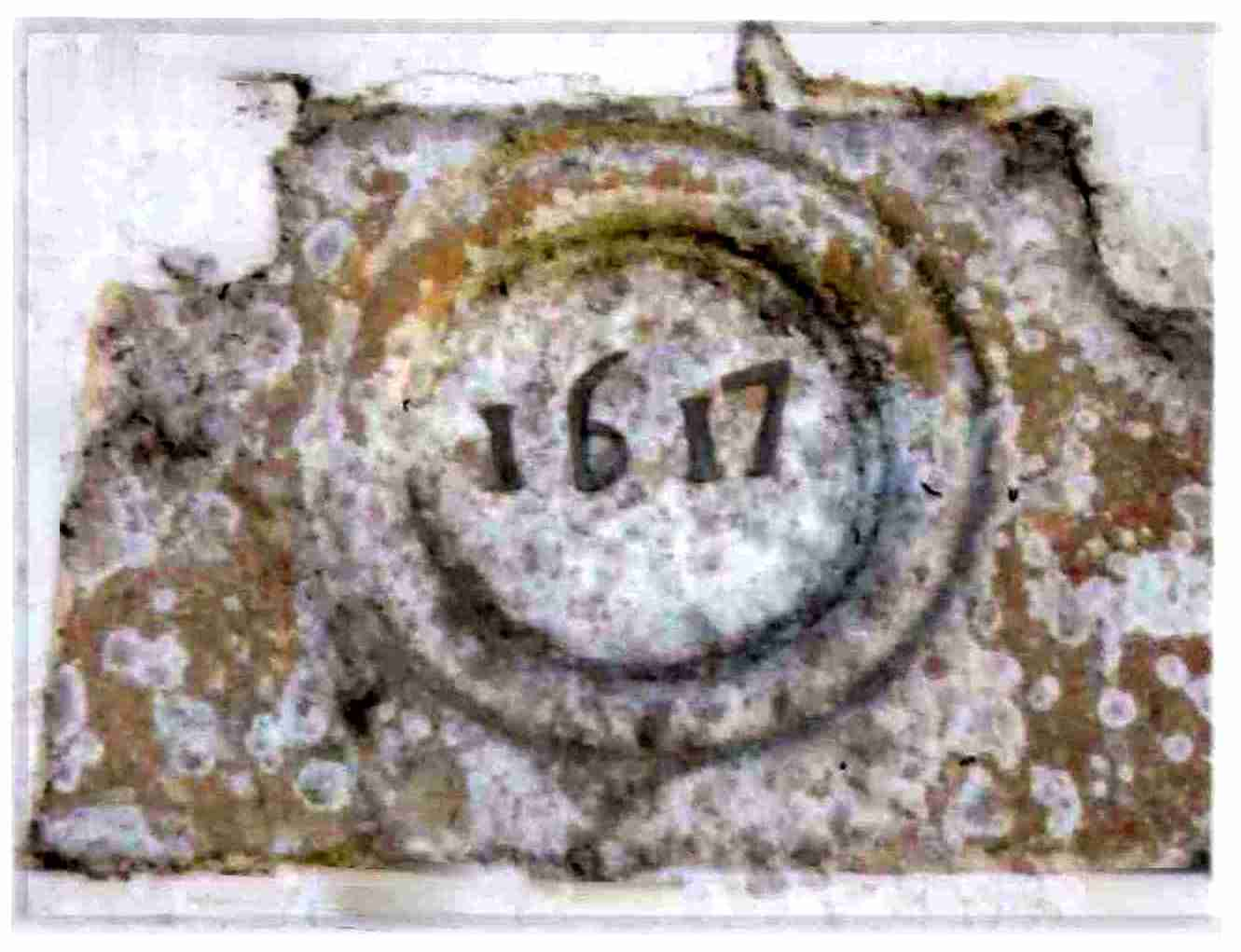
Plaque on wall of old school

== Bibliography ==
- Dalby, LJ (2000) [1971]. The Wilts and Berks Canal (3rd ed.). Usk: Oakwood Press. p. 23. ISBN 0-85361-562-4.
- Delaney, Frank (1983). Betjeman Country. Paladin (Granada). p. 158. ISBN 0-586-08499-1.
- Ditchfield, PH; Page, William, eds. (1924). "Uffington". A History of the County of Berkshire. Victoria County History. Vol. IV. assisted by John Hautenville Cope. London: The St Katherine Press. pp. 543–551.
- Ekwall, Eilert (1960) [1936]. Concise Oxford Dictionary of English Place-Names (4th ed.). Oxford: Oxford University Press. Uffington. ISBN 0198691033.
- Hooke, Della (1987). "Anglo-Saxon Estates in the Vale of the White Horse" (PDF). Oxoniensia. LII. Oxfordshire Architectural and Historical Society: 129–144. ISSN 0308-5562.
- Ford, David (2001). "Uffington: St Mary's Church". Royal Berkshire History.
- Ford, David (2003). "The Uffington White Horse, Part 1". Royal Berkshire History.
- Ford, David (2004). "Uffington". Royal Berkshire History.
- Haval, Nikhilesh. "St Mary's, Uffington". Oxfordshire in 360 degrees. Nikreations.
- Loyn, HR (1962). Anglo-Saxon England and the Norman Conquest. Social and Economic History of England. London: Longmans, Green & Co. pp. 171–172.
- Pevsner, Nikolaus (1966). Berkshire. The Buildings of England. Harmondsworth: Penguin Books. pp. 243–245.
- Rhodes, PP (1950). "The Celtic Field-Systems on the Berkshire Downs" (PDF). Oxoniensia. XV. Oxford Architectural and Historical Society: 1–28. ISSN 0308-5562.
