= John Grantham =

English engineer

- Born: 1809; Croydon, Surrey, England
- Died: 10 July 1874 (aged 64–65); Croydon, Surrey, England
- Engineering career
- Discipline: Mechanical engineering

John Grantham (1809–1874) was an English engineer, born in Croydon Surrey, who was involved in marine, railway and tramway engineering. He was the second son of another John Grantham. After leaving school, John (junior) worked with his father surveying routes for projected railway lines in England.

== To Ireland ==
His father, John Grantham (1774-1833), was appointed as John Rennie's assistant to survey the River Shannon. He introduced steam navigation to the inland Shannon in 1827 and his steam boats plied the Shannon and the Grand Canal and were taken up by the City of Dublin Steam Packet Company. He is buried in the cathedral at Killaloe where there is a commemorative wall tablet. His son assisted him in the work.

== Return to England ==
=== Mather, Dixon and Company ===
Returning to England, he joined Mather, Dixon and Company in Liverpool and later became a manager and partner in the firm.

=== Naval work ===
Mather, Dixon and Company closed in 1843 and Grantham began a practice as a Naval Architect and Consulting Engineer. He was involved in the design of several large iron sailing and steam ships, including Sarah Sands, Pacific, Antelope and Empress Eugenie. He became Engineer to the Whitehaven Steamship Company, and other companies, and was involved in the construction of vessels for Australia and Egypt. In 1859 he left Liverpool for London, where he continued to do work for the mercantile marine.

=== Railways and tramways ===
In 1860, became Engineer to the Buenos Aires Northern Railway, Argentina. In 1863, he created the first tramway in Copenhagen, Denmark.

In 1872 he designed a steam tramcar. This was a four-wheel double-deck car with two vertical boilers in the centre. The boilers were of the Field type and each was 18 inches diameter and 4 ft 4 in high. The engine, placed under the floor, had two cylinders, each 4" diameter and 10" stroke. These drove a single pair of driving wheels, 30" diameter. The car could be driven from either end. The car was built in 1873 by the Oldbury Carriage and Wagon Company and the steam machinery was supplied by Merryweather & Sons.

The car was tried out in London, at West Brompton and in Vauxhall Bridge Road, but it was not a great success. Edward Woods modified it, by fitting a single Shand Mason boiler in place of the twin Merryweather boilers, and it was then used on the Wantage Tramway from about 1876 to 1881. The car re-appeared on the Portsdown and Horndean Tramway about 1903 and was derelict when that line closed in 1934.

== Innovations ==
In 1830, Grantham won a prize from the London and North Western Railway for a design for pulling up passenger carriages from Lime Street to Edge Hill Station, Liverpool, by stationary engines. He took out several patents for screw propellers and invented a system of sheathing iron-built ships with wood and copper, to prevent fouling in tropical climates.
