= Wantage railway station =

Former railway station in England

Coordinates: 51.5904°N 1.4286°W

Wantage

General information
- Location: Wantage, Vale of White Horse, Oxfordshire; England
- Grid reference: SU398881
- Platforms: 1

Other information
- Status: Disused

History
- Original company: Wantage Tramway

Key dates
- 1 October 1875: Station opens to freight
- 11 October 1875: Station opens to passengers
- 1 August 1925: Station closes to passengers
- 22 December 1945: Station closes to freight
Location

Wantage railway station is a closed stone and brick built station located on Mill Street, Wantage in Oxfordshire on the Wantage Tramway line. The station closed fully in 1945 when Wantage Tramway ceased operations.

== History ==
Formed in 1873 to link Wantage Road station with its terminus at Wantage the line was cheaply built parallel to what was then the Besselsleigh Turnpike, and now the A338.

The line was opened for goods on 1 October 1875, and to passengers on 11 October. The tramway junction was to the east of Wantage Road station; interchange passengers walked under the bridge to reach the tramway yard, where the westernmost siding (parallel to the road) was reserved for passenger tramcars.

For most of its operation the line was well used and profitable but the advent of popular road transport saw a steady decline in passengers and freight. The tramway closed to passengers on 1 August 1925, and to goods on 22 December 1945.

Former Services

Preceding station	Disused railways	Following station
Wantage Road; Line and station closed	Wantage Tramway Company	Terminus
