= Longworth Hospital =

- Oxfordshire Area Health Authority

Geography
- Location: Faringdon, Oxfordshire, England
- Coordinates: 51.6596°N 1.5848°W (approximate)

Organisation
- Type: General

Services
- Beds: 50

History
- Closed: 1981

Links
- Lists: Hospitals in England

Longworth Hospital was a 50 bedded geriatric hospital in Faringdon Oxfordshire, England.

It was administered by the Littlemore and Isis hospital management committees, and then from 1974 by Oxfordshire Area Health Authority.

From December 1980 to February 1981 it was occupied by the staff, principally members of COHSE resisting the closure of the hospital.
