= Baulking =

Village in Oxfordshire, England

Coordinates: 51.615°N 1.539°W

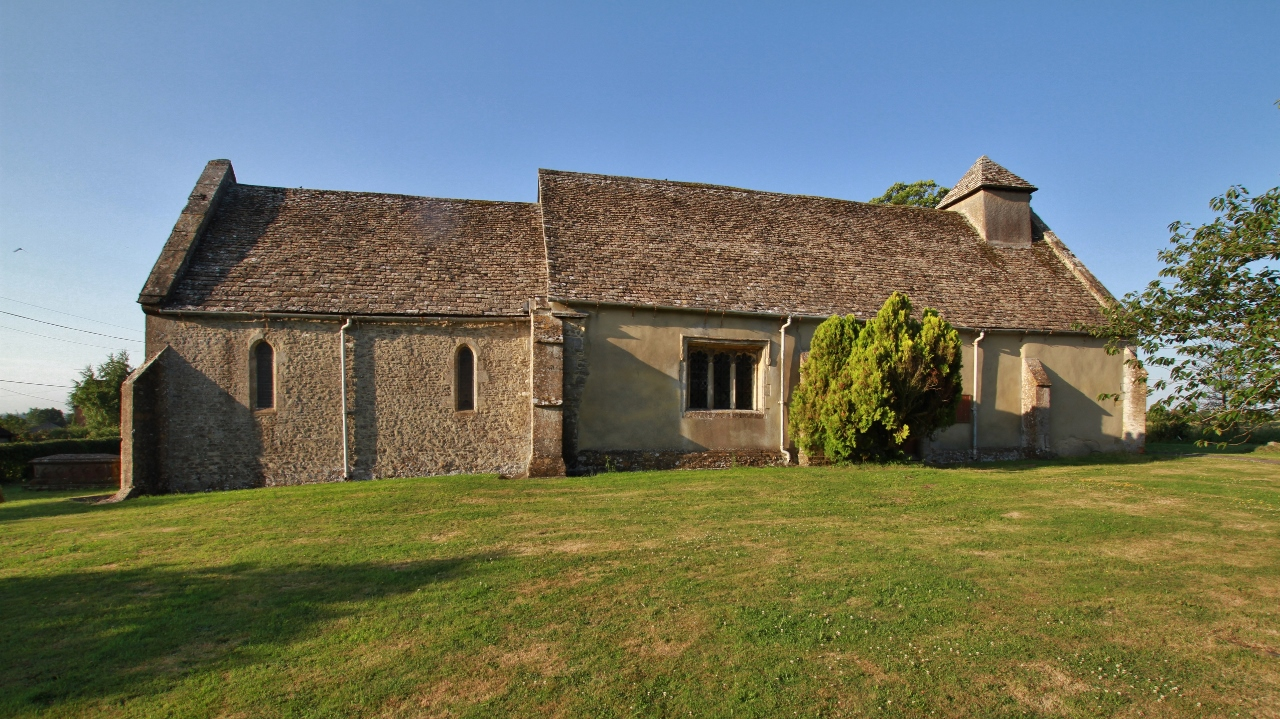
- St Nicholas' parish church

- Location within Oxfordshire
- Area: 6.38 km^{2} (2.46 sq mi)
- Population: 107 (2011 Census)
  - Density: 17/km^{2} (44/sq mi)
- OS grid reference: SU3190
- Civil parish: Baulking
- District: Vale of White Horse
- Shire county: Oxfordshire
- Region: South East
- Country: England
- Sovereign state: United Kingdom
- Post town: Faringdon
- Postcode district: SN7
- Dialling code: 01367
- Police: Thames Valley
- Fire: Oxfordshire
- Ambulance: South Central
- UK Parliament: Didcot and Wantage

Baulking or Balking is a village and civil parish about 3 1/2 miles (5.6 km) southeast of Faringdon in the Vale of White Horse district of Oxfordshire, England. It was part of Berkshire until the 1974 Boundary Changes transferred it to Oxfordshire.

== Topography ==
The parish is bounded to the north and north-west by the River Ock, to the south by its tributary Stutfield Brook and to the east by field boundaries. The village is arranged along a large, elongated village green running north–south, on the side of a slight rise of land bounded on two sides by a bend in the river.

== History ==
Saxon charters record the manor as Bedelacinge in 948 and as Baðalacing and Badalacing in 963. Balking and Bedelakinges are other 10th-century spellings of the name. 12th-century forms included Badeleching in a pipe roll from 1121 and Badeking in other records. A charter from about 1200 records it as Badeleking and another dated 1286 records it as Bathelking. Later spellings include Bauking in the 16th century and Bawlkin in the 17th century. The name's etymology is Old English but its meaning has not been determined. It may come from a stream name. The first part of the name may come from bæþ meaning "bath" and lācing may come from the same Old English word as Lockinge.

=== Manor ===
In 948 King Eadred gave five hides of land at Baulking to his servant Cuthred, and it was said that Cuthred gave the land to the Benedictine Abingdon Abbey. By 1187 the manor had passed to the lords of Kingston Lisle, with whom it remained until the 20th century.

== Parish church ==
The Church of England parish church of Saint Nicholas was built at the beginning of the 13th century as a dependent chapel of Uffington. The chancel has an Early English Gothic corner piscina and lancet windows. In the 14th century diagonal buttresses were added to the church and two Decorated Gothic windows were added in the south wall of the nave. The Perpendicular Gothic window in the north wall of the nave was added late in the 15th century. The oak pulpit is Jacobean and came from Grittleton in Wiltshire. The nave roof is also Jacobean. St. Nicholas' Communion plate includes a chalice made in 1583. The church is a grade I listed building. Baulking was made an ecclesiastical parish separate from Uffington in 1846. St Nicholas' is now once again part of the Uffington Benefice, along with the parishes of Shellingford and Woolstone.

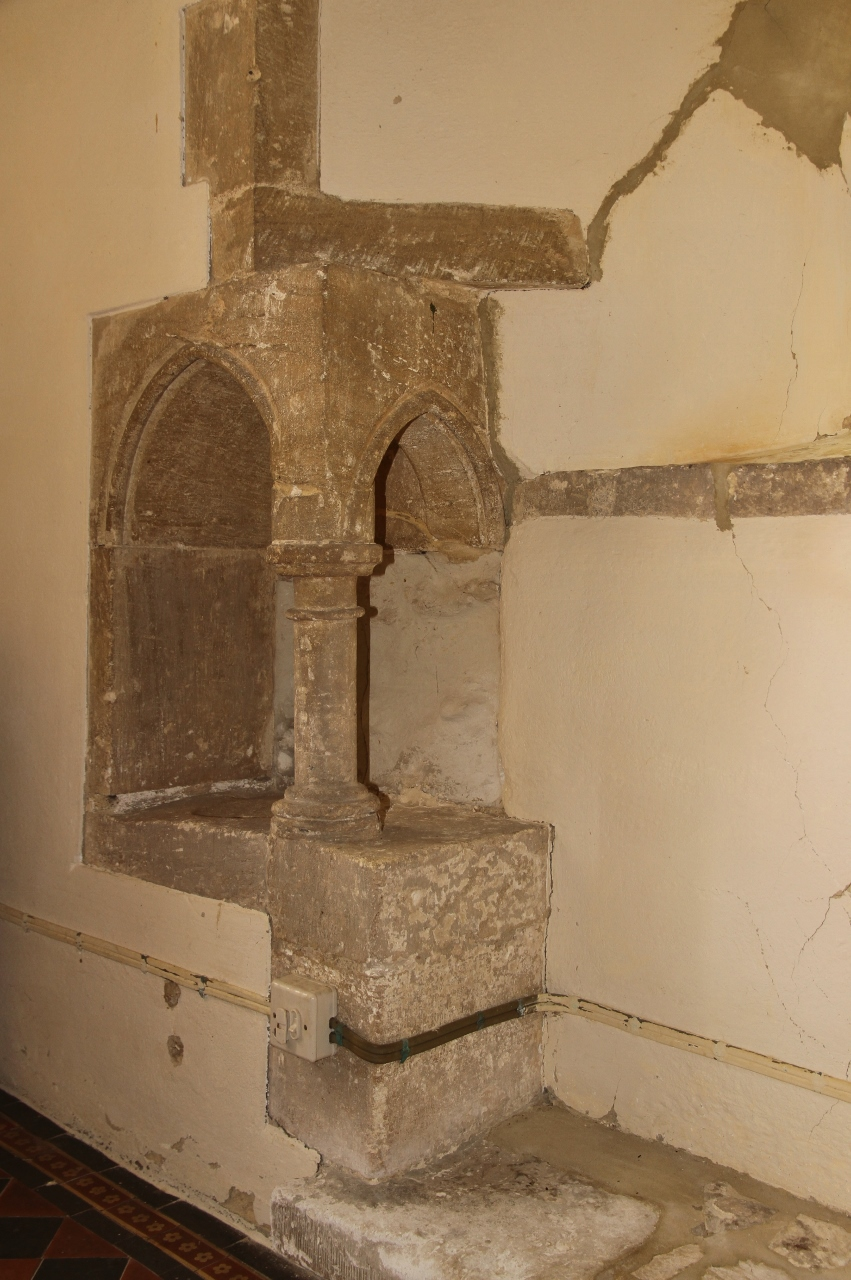
Corner piscina in the parish church of St Nicholas

== Economic History ==
Baulking was an ancient market town, with market day on Thursday. In 1219 the market was changed to Tuesday and by 1792 it had ceased to be held. The common lands of Uffington, Baulking and Woolstone were enclosed in 1776. Baulking parish school was built in 1877. It is now a private house. The Great Western Main Line was built through the southern part of the parish and opened in 1840. The line immediately abuts the southern tip of the village.

== Demography ==
The 2011 Census recorded the parish population as 107, which was ten fewer than were recorded by the 2001 Census. The 2011 Census recorded that the numbers of each sex were equal, eight residents were born overseas, seven were aged under five, and 20 were aged between five and 15. A majority of its 66-strong working population were directors, managers, skilled professionals or administrators. Eight of the latter main cohort of the population were machine or plant operators or skilled agricultural workers. One of the 41 households had no access to a car or van.

== Sources ==
- Ditchfield, PH; Page, William, eds. (1924). "Uffington". A History of the County of Berkshire. Victoria County History. Vol. IV. assisted by John Hautenville Cope. London: The St Katherine Press. pp. 543–551.
- Ekwall, Eilert (1960) [1936]. Concise Oxford Dictionary of English Place-Names (4th ed.). Oxford: Oxford University Press. Balking. ISBN 0198691033.
- Pevsner, Nikolaus (1966). Berkshire. The Buildings of England. Harmondsworth: Penguin Books. pp. 78–79.
