= Faringdon railway station =

Former railway station in England

Coordinates: 51.6545°N 1.5860°W

Faringdon
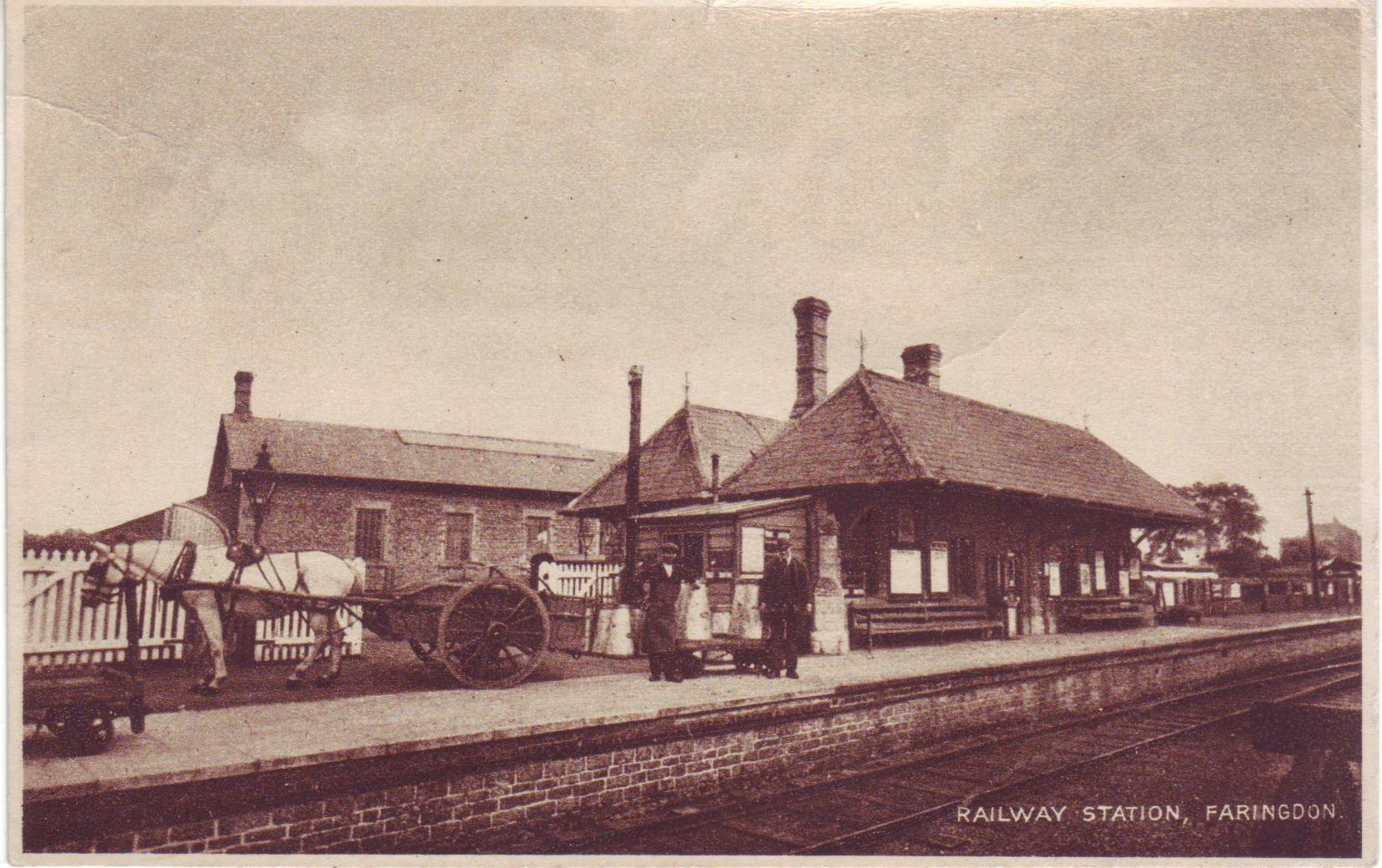

General information
- Location: Faringdon, Vale of White Horse; England
- Grid reference: SU287951
- Platforms: 2

Other information
- Status: Disused

History
- Original company: Faringdon Railway
- Pre-grouping: Great Western Railway
- Post-grouping: Great Western Railway

Key dates
- 1864: Station opens
- 1951: Station closes to passengers
- 1963: Station closes to freight
Location

Faringdon railway station is a closed stone and brick built railway station that served the market town of Faringdon, in Oxfordshire, England and was on the Faringdon branch line.

== History ==
The line was opened on 1 June 1864, between Faringdon and the Great Western Railway (GWR) at Uffington, with construction funded by a consortium of local business men called the Faringdon Railway Company which was purchased outright by the GWR in 1886. Constructed as a broad gauge line it was converted to standard gauge in 1878. Passenger traffic peaked in 1913, but later declined to such an extent that the passenger service was withdrawn on 31 December 1951. Freight traffic continued to use the line until 1 July 1963.

Faringdon Town Council proposed in 2005 to reopen the line but it remains closed.

The station building is still extant, having been used for various commercial purposes; it has been a children's nursery since 2002.

Preceding station	Disused railways	Following station
Uffington	British Railways; Faringdon Branch Line	Terminus
