= Wantage Tramway =

Tram line in Oxfordshire, UK, 1873–1945

Coordinates: 51°36′45″N 1°24′45″W

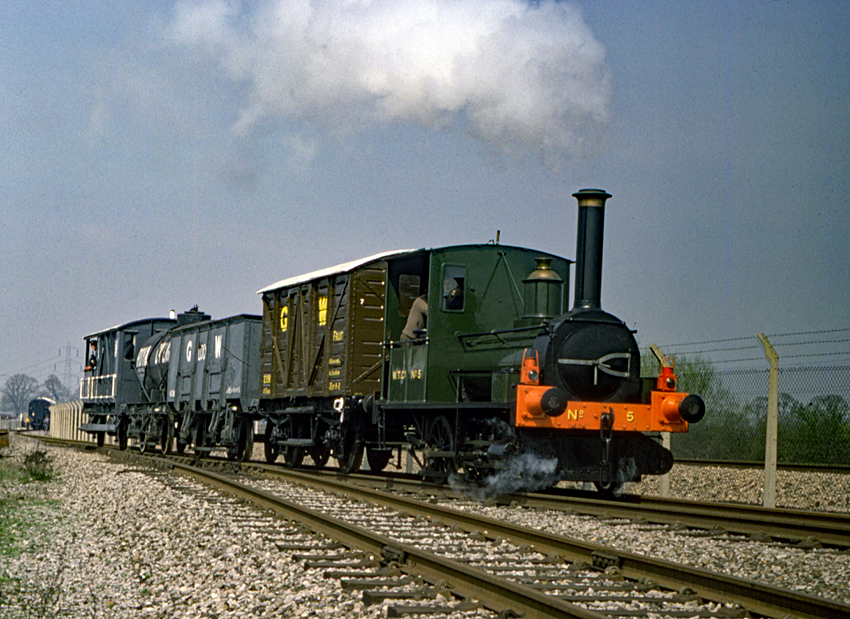
- Centenary celebrations

Operation
- Locale: Wantage
- Open: 1875
- Close: 1925 (passengers); 1945 (goods)
- Status: Closed

Infrastructure
- Track gauge: 1,435 mm (4 ft 8 1/2 in)
- Propulsion system: Steam
- Depot: Mill Street

Statistics
- Route length: Approximately 2 1/2 miles (4 km)

The Wantage Tramway Company was a two-mile tramway that carried passengers and freight between the Oxfordshire town of Wantage and Wantage Road Station on the Great Western Main Line in England. Formed in 1873 to link Wantage Road station with its terminus at Mill Street, Wantage the line was cheaply built parallel to what was then the Besselsleigh Turnpike, and now the A338. The tramway closed to passengers in 1925 and to goods traffic in 1945.

== Opening ==
The line was opened for goods on 1 October 1875, and to passengers on 11 October. The tramway junction was to the east of Wantage Road station; interchange passengers walked under the bridge to reach the tramway yard, where the westernmost siding (parallel to the road) was reserved for passenger tramcars.

== Rolling stock ==
Built as a standard gauge line, and first run using horse drawn rolling stock, the line became the first to adopt mechanical traction when a steam-powered tramcar, designed by John Grantham, was tried out in the summer of 1875, entering regular service from 1 August 1876. In November that year the first steam locomotive arrived for trials, and the line was converted to steam traction in the late 1870s.

Locomotives

Number	Description	Notes
1	John Grantham steam tramcar	-
2	Merryweather & Sons tram engine	-
3	Details unknown	-
4	Henry Hughes tram engine	-
5	George England and Co. 0-4-0WT	ex-London and North Western Railway; previously with the Sandy and Potton Railway
6	James Matthews patent tram engine	-
7	Manning Wardle 0-4-0ST	ex-Manchester Ship Canal contract

Wantage Tramway Co.

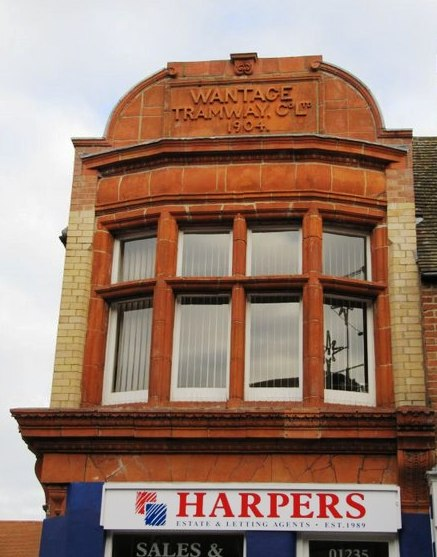
Head office building in Mill Street

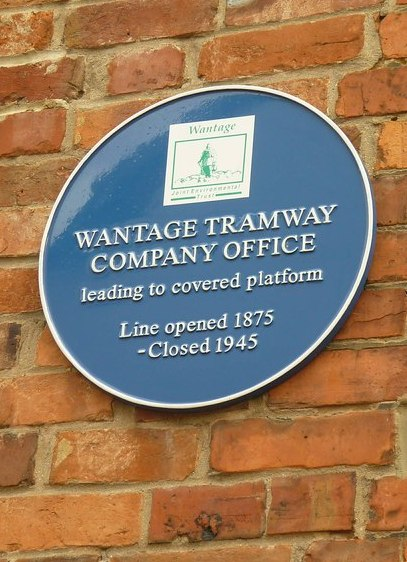
Blue plaque on the building

Two Mekarski system compressed air trams were tried out in 1880 but were not a success as the fuel consumption was much higher than for steam locomotives. Several other steam locomotives were used for short periods, including GWR no. 1329 Raven (Avonside Engine Company 0-4-0ST 1052/1874), GWR no. 1359 Wye (Fletcher, Jennings & Co. 0-4-0T 153/1876) and ex-Royal Arsenal Railway Driver (Manning Wardle 0-4-0ST 515/1875).

== Operation ==
For most of its operation the line was well used and profitable but the advent of popular road transport saw a steady decline in passengers and freight. The tramway closed to passengers on 1 August 1925, and to goods on 22 December 1945.

The line remained independent throughout its existence, and its range of unusual and often outdated equipment attracted attention from railway historians. It ultimately closed after the track was damaged by heavy lorries during the Second World War, by which time repair would have been unaffordable.

== Preservation ==
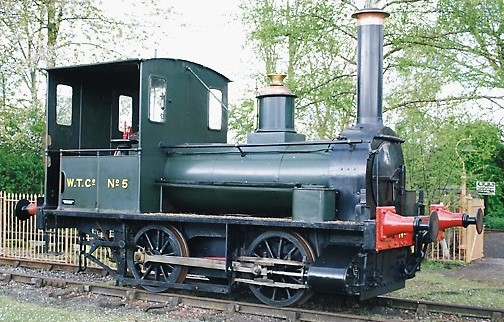
Locomotive No 5 'Shannon'

WTC Locomotive No 5 known on the tramway as 'Jane' but more recently named 'Shannon' and formerly of the Sandy and Potton Railway in Bedfordshire, survives and can be found at the Great Western Society's Railway Centre at Didcot in Oxfordshire.
