= Wantage Road railway station =

Former railway station in England

Coordinates: 51.6197°N 1.4085°W

Wantage Road
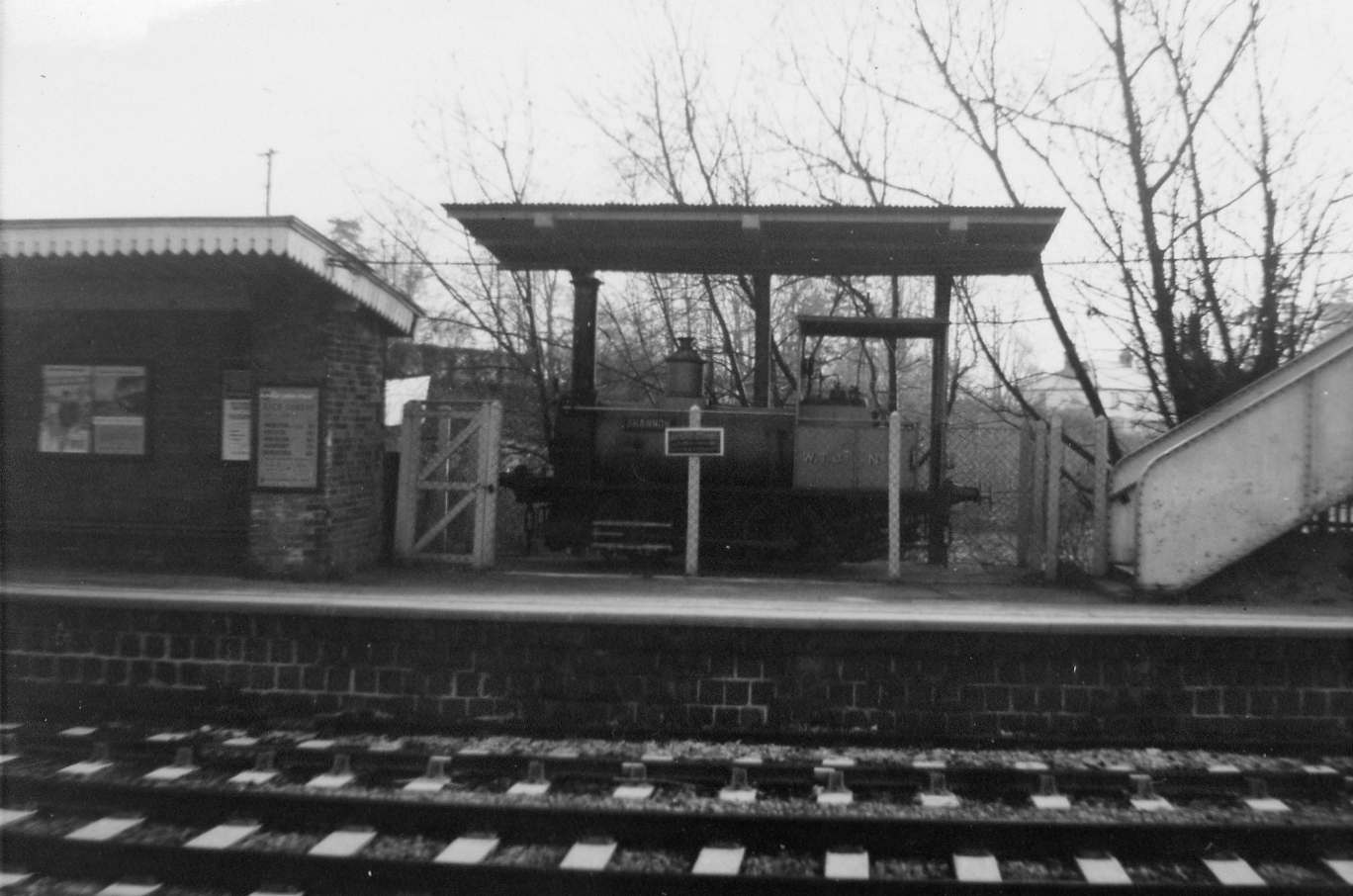
- Wantage Road station just prior to closure showing preserved Wantage Tramway loco "Shannon".

General information
- Location: Grove, District of Vale of White Horse; England
- Grid reference: SU414913
- Platforms: 2

Other information
- Status: Disused

History
- Original company: Great Western Railway
- Pre-grouping: GWR
- Post-grouping: GWR; Western Region of British Railways

Key dates
- 1846: Opened
- 7 December 1964: Closed for passengers
- 29 March 1965: closed for goods
Location

Wantage Road railway station was a railway station on the Great Western Main Line in the Vale of White Horse district in Oxfordshire. The station was actually at the village of Grove, Oxfordshire (then part of Berkshire), more than two miles north of Wantage. The station closed in December 1964 as part of the Beeching cuts.

== History ==
Wantage Road station was opened in 1846, six years after the section of the GWR main line that served it.

In 1873 the independent Wantage Tramway was formed to link Wantage Road station with its terminus at Mill Street, Wantage; it was built parallel to what was then the Besselsleigh Turnpike (now the A338). This short line was opened for goods on 1 October 1875, and to passengers on 11 October. The tramway junction was to the east of Wantage Road station; interchange passengers walked under the bridge to reach the tramway yard, where the westernmost siding (parallel to the road) was reserved for passenger tramcars.

The tramway closed to passengers on 1 August 1925, and to goods on 22 December 1945.

On 7 December 1964 British Railways withdrew passenger services from Wantage Road and all other intermediate stations between Didcot and Swindon; the goods yard survived a little longer, closing on 29 March 1965. The station buildings have been demolished but the platforms survive.

=== Post-closure ===
In June 2009 the Association of Train Operating Companies (ATOC) produced a report called 'Connecting Communities' in which it was suggested that Wantage Road Station would be a viable station to re-open during any expansion of the rail network. If a proposed service from Oxford to Westbury is given the green light, it is hoped that a new station entitled either Wantage & Grove or Wantage Parkway can be built as part of the introduction of this service.

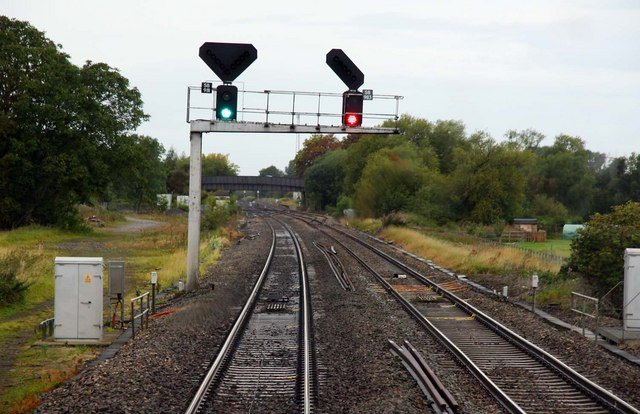
Signals for Wantage Road Loop on the Great Western Main Line.

Plans and proposals for a new railway station to serve Wantage and Grove have been around for several years. In August 2018, Oxfordshire County Council published proposals and a business case for a new station in Grove with the assumption that a new station could open in 2025.

As the station would be situated on a main line currently served only by intercity services, a new service would be needed to serve the station. The county council's ambition would be for a new hourly service between Bristol and Oxford which could call at all major existing stations along the route as well as the new station in Grove and new stations in Corsham and Royal Wootton Bassett. It is then hoped that this service could be extended to Milton Keynes or Cambridge once East West Rail is fully completed in 2027.

Six possible locations for a new station were identified with two being shortlisted as good potential locations. One of the two potential locations is very close to the site of the former Wantage Road station, just to the north of the Williams Formula One factory with the second location being further west with access on Denchworth Road. Depending on which site is chosen, the cost of building a new station is estimated to be between £11 million and £13 million.

A new feasibility study was commissioned by Oxfordshire County Council in March 2025, expected to be published in September 2025.

Preceding station	Historical railways	Following station
Steventon; Line open, station closed	British Rail; Western Region; Great Western Main Line	Challow; Line open, station closed
Terminus	Wantage Tramway	Wantage; Line and station closed
