= Faringdon branch =

The Faringdon branch was a 3 1/2-mile-long branch line from Uffington Station to Faringdon in the Vale of White Horse, in Oxfordshire.

== History ==
=== Opening ===
Faringdon Railway Act 1860
- Act of Parliament
- Parliament of the United Kingdom
- Long title: An Act for making a Railway from the Great Western Railway to the Town of Faringdon, to be called "The Faringdon Railway."
- Citation: 23 & 24 Vict. c. cxcvi

Dates
- Royal assent: 13 August 1860

Text of statute as originally enacted

The line was authorised by the Faringdon Railway Act 1860 (23 & 24 Vict. c. cxcvi) and opened in 1864, between Faringdon and the Great Western Railway (GWR) at Uffington, with construction funded by a consortium of local businessmen called the Faringdon Railway Company, which was bought outright by the GWR under the Great Western Railway Act 1886 (49 & 50 Vict. c. cvi).

The line was inspected on 13 April 1864 by Capt. F. H. Rich R.E., who found numerous faults that prevented the line's opening, including weak bridges. Rich re-inspected the line on 13 May and passed the line for opening, which was done on 1 June 1864.

=== Gauge conversion ===
Constructed as a broad gauge line, it was converted to standard gauge in 1878.

=== Decline and closure ===
Passenger traffic peaked in 1913, but later declined to such an extent that the passenger service was withdrawn in 1951. Freight traffic continued to use the line until the Beeching cuts of 1963.

== Reopening proposal ==
Faringdon Town Council proposed in 2005 to reopen the line, but it remains closed.
