= Faringdon =

Market town in Oxfordshire, England

Coordinates: 51.657°N 1.586°W

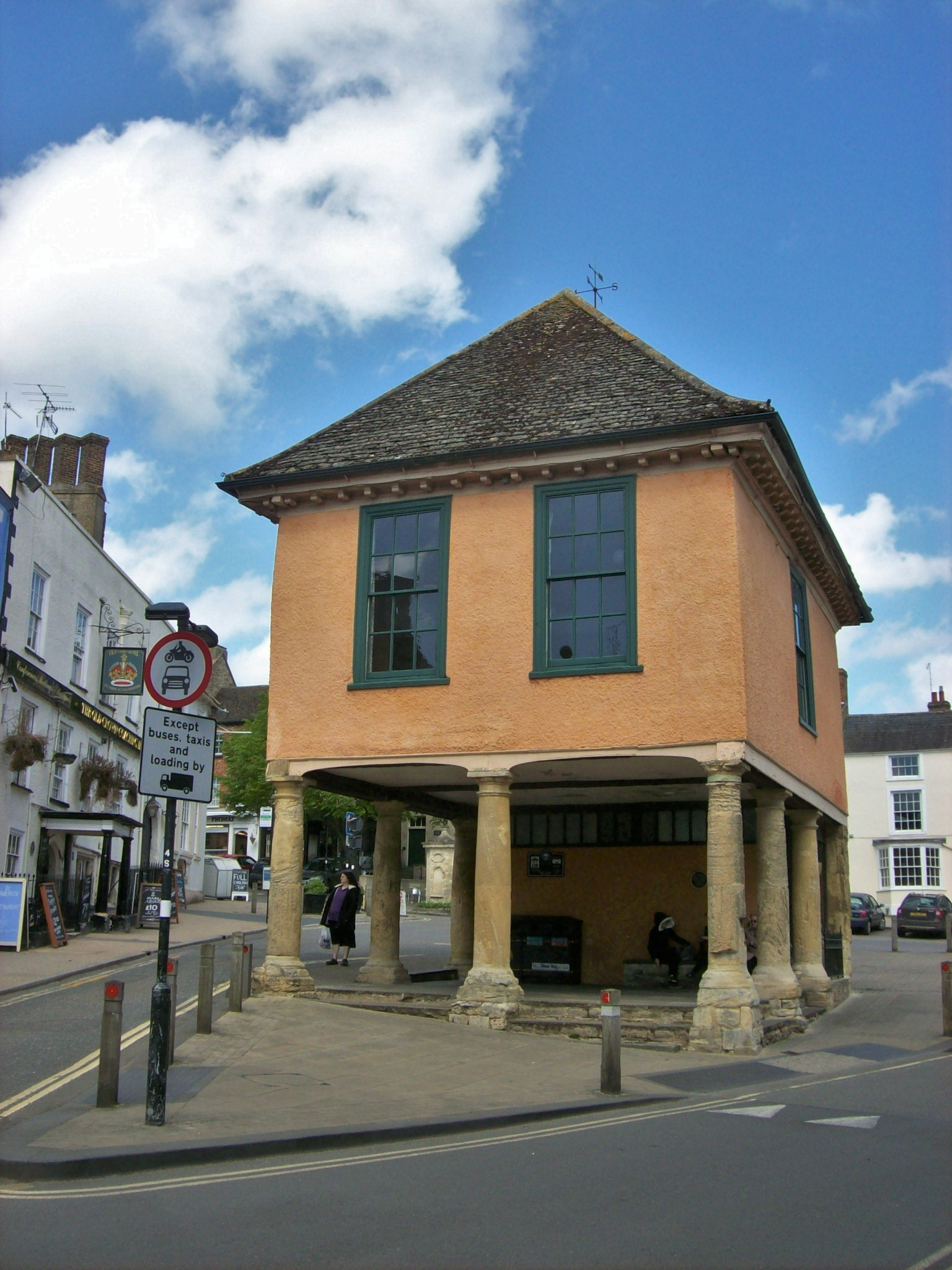
- The Old Town Hall

- Location within Oxfordshire
- Population: 7,121 (2011 Census)
- OS grid reference: SU286954
  - London: 78 miles (126 km)
- Civil parish: Great Faringdon
- District: Vale of White Horse
- Shire county: Oxfordshire
- Region: South East
- Country: England
- Sovereign state: United Kingdom
- Post town: Faringdon
- Postcode district: SN7
- Dialling code: 01367
- Police: Thames Valley
- Fire: Oxfordshire
- Ambulance: South Central
- UK Parliament: Witney
- Website: Faringdon Town Council

Faringdon /ˈfærɪŋdən/ is a historic market town in the Vale of White Horse, Oxfordshire, England, 18 miles (29 km) south-west of Oxford, 10 miles (16 km) north-west of Wantage and 12 miles (19 km) east-north-east of Swindon. Its views extend to the River Thames in the north and the highest ground visible is on the Ridgeway in the south. Faringdon was Berkshire's westernmost town until the 1974 boundary changes transferred its administration to Oxfordshire. The civil parish is formally known as Great Faringdon, to distinguish it from Little Faringdon in West Oxfordshire. The 2011 Census gave a population of 7,121; it was estimated at 7,992 in 2019. On 1 February 2004, Faringdon became the first place in south-east England to be awarded Fairtrade Town status.

== History ==
The toponym 'Faringdon' means 'hill covered in fern'. Claims, for example by P. J. Goodrich, that King Edward the Elder (reigned 899–924) died in Faringdon are unfounded. Domesday Book of 1086 records Farendone as a large settlement with 45 households (in the top 20% of all settlements in England for population) in the ancient hundred of Wyfold in Berkshire. Faringdon was one of many settlements owned by the king so had the benefit of paying no geld, a land tax.

After the Conquest a castle was erected in Faringdon by the Earl of Gloucester, which was afterwards razed by Stephen, who built upon its site a priory for Cistercian monks, subject to Beaulieu Abbey, in Hampshire. Faringdon developed into a borough and was apparently already separate from the hundred of Wyfold when granted by King John to Beaulieu Abbey. King John established an abbey in Faringdon in 1202 (probably on the site of Portwell House), but its monks removed to Beaulieu Abbey in 1203. The Faringdon land grant became an outlying grange, one of a network of farms, worked to provide food for the monks and also to help support the abbey's economy. The hundred of Faringdon, as held by the abbot of Beaulieu, included the parishes of Great and Little Faringdon and Coxwell.

The town was granted a weekly market in 1218, and as a result came to be called Chipping Faringdon. A weekly outdoor market is still held on Tuesdays.

In 1417 the aged Archbishop of Dublin, Thomas Cranley, died in Faringdon while journeying to London.

At the Dissolution of the Monasteries in the early sixteenth century, the abbey lands in Faringdon were sold to wealthy nobles.

In 1838, Faringdon (also written as Farringdon Great), and Faringdon Little located six miles distant, and other parishes were mainly within Faringdon hundred, Berkshire. In the late 19th century as technology increased the ability to provide higher general standard of living, new specialized units were formed to provide additional functions such as poor law unions rather than parish-level charity, and rural sewer districts to provide sub-county level health improvements, leading to the formation of the Faringdon Rural District. So the hundred faded from use, especially as county- and city-level courts of justice were instituted.

Due to major populations increases in boroughs and cities, the increase in transportation between regions, and longstanding ties between communities, the centuries-old county boundaries had in many areas become a hindrance to "getting things done", both in the administration of government functions and in some areas in daily business and personal activities. So in the 20th century a major restructuring across England and Wales meant that the local impact would cause Faringdon and nearby parishes (i.e. all the parishes of the hundred of Faringdon) to be transferred from Berkshire to Oxfordshire when the border was redrawn on 1 April 1974 due to the Local Government Act 1972.

== Places of interest ==
=== All Saints' Church ===
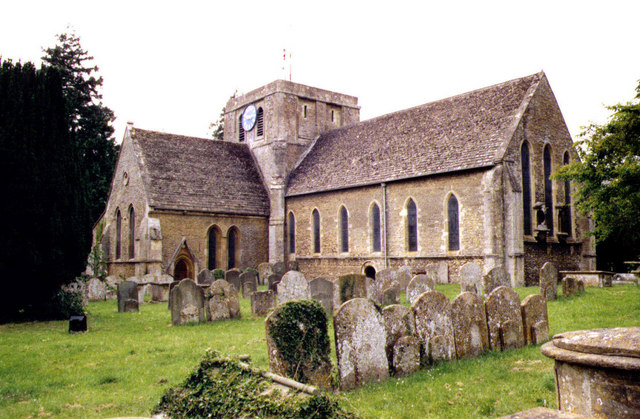
All Saints' Parish Church

The Church of England parish church of All Saints may date from the 12th century, and the clerestory and possibly the west end of the nave survive from this period. A Norman doorway survives, although not in its original position, in the baptistery. The chancel and north transept are 13th century and the west chapel is 14th century. The north chapel is a late medieval Perpendicular Gothic addition with 15th-century windows.

All Saints has a central bell tower, which was reduced in height in 1645 after it was damaged by a cannonball in the English Civil War. Faringdon was fought over because it commanded the road to the Radcot Bridge over the River Thames. The tower now has a ring of eight bells. The three oldest bells were cast in 1708. James Wells of Aldbourne, Wiltshire, cast the tenor bell in 1779 and another bell in 1803. The three youngest bells, including the treble, were cast in 1874 by Mears and Stainbank.

European exiles Arturo Barea and Ilse Barea-Kulcsar are buried in the churchyard.

=== Local legend ===
The churchyard is said to be haunted by the headless ghost of a naval officer, Hampden Pye. Local legend has it that Pye was decapitated in a battlefield explosion while fighting in the War of the Spanish Succession, after being convinced to join up by his mother, who sought to separate him from a local girl she considered an unsuitable match. An alternative legend states that Pye was an unfaithful husband who was decapitated by his wife with a gun. The ghost was reportedly exorcised shortly after Pye's death.

=== Old Town Hall ===
The Old Town Hall (once the Market Hall) in the Market Place dates from the 17th century. It is a Grade II* listed building. The Corn Exchange, which was designed in the Gothic Revival style, is more recent and dates from 1863.

=== Faringdon Folly ===
Just east of the town is Folly Hill or Faringdon Hill, a Greensand outcrop. In common with Badbury Hill to the west of the town, it has an ancient ditched defensive ring (hill fort). This was fortified by supporters of Matilda sometime during the Anarchy of 1135–1141, when she claimed the throne from King Stephen, but was soon defeated by him. Oliver Cromwell fortified it in an unsuccessful campaign to defeat the Royalist garrison at Faringdon House. The Pye family had Scots pines planted around the summit, around the time that Faringdon House was rebuilt in the late 18th century. The building is a conspicuous landmark from the Vale of White Horse, White Horse Hill, the Berkshire Downs near Lockinge, and the Cotswolds to the north-west.

The folly on Folly Hill was designed by Lord Gerald Wellesley, later 7th Duke of Wellington, for Lord Berners, and built in 1935. It is 140 feet (43 m) high and affords panoramic views of the Vale of White Horse. It once bore a sign saying "Members of the public committing suicide from this tower do so at their own risk." During the Second World War the Home Guard used it as an observation post. The scholar John Garth has suggested that the folly was inspiration for Saruman's tower, Orthanc, in J. R. R. Tolkien's The Lord of the Rings, and that Berners's painting of the Folly atop its hill led Tolkien to make a similar painting of a view in the Shire, "The Hill: Hobbiton-across-the-Water". In 1982 Robert Heber-Percy restored it and gave it to the town in trust. It has been a Grade II listed building since 1986. Near the top of London Street near Faringdon Folly is a pub bearing that name.

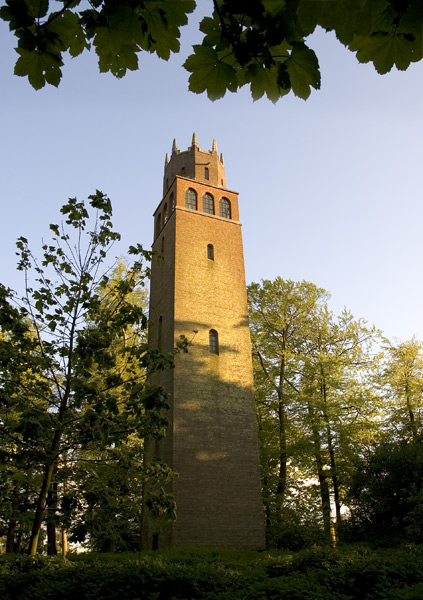
Faringdon Folly,
built by Lord Berners on his estate in 1935

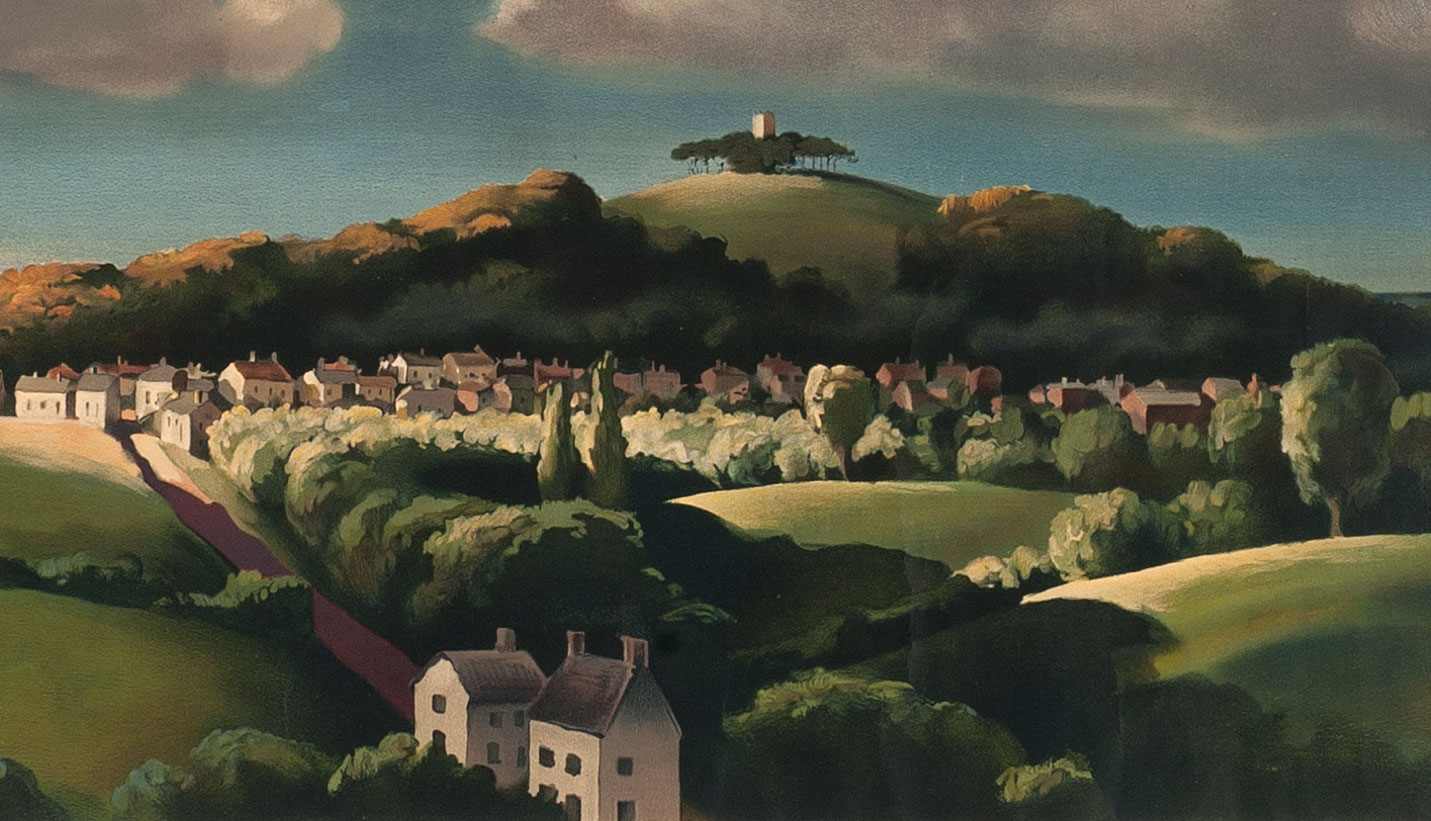
Detail of Lord Berners's 1936 painting of Faringdon Folly, used as an advertisement by Shell, 1936

=== Faringdon House ===
There is a manor house and estate, close to the edge of Faringdon, called Faringdon House. The original house was damaged during the civil war. Its owner at the time, Sir Robert Pye, who was a Royalist, was put under siege by his own son Robert who was a Parliamentarian colonel. Building of the current, smaller, house began about 1780 and was not completed until after 1785. The house was bought in 1787 by William Hallett Esq. It was the home of Lord Berners in the mid-20th century. For a time it was owned by the writer Sofka Zinovieff, the granddaughter of Berners' companion, Robert Heber-Percy, who inherited it on Berners' death in 1950.

== Geology ==
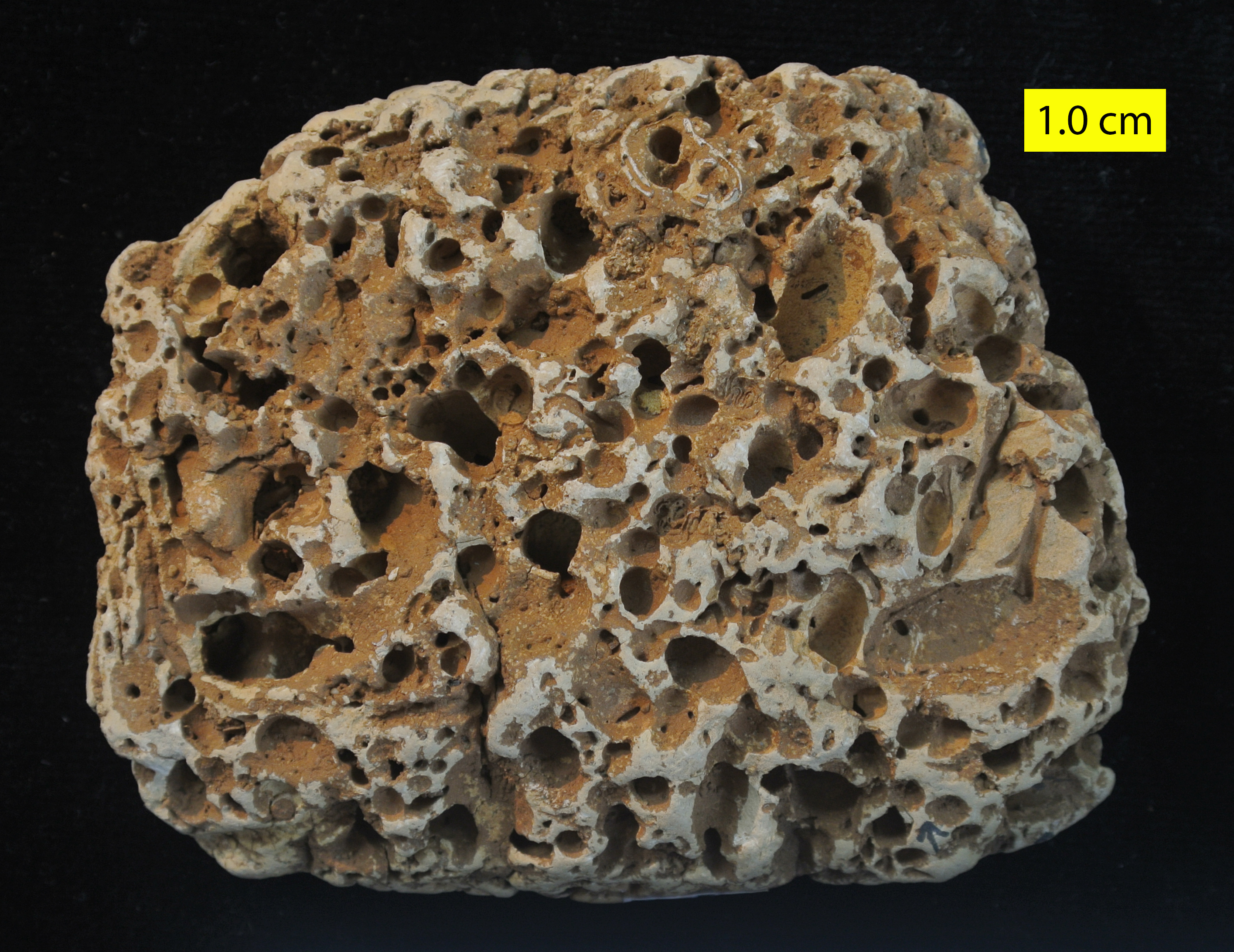
Numerous borings in a Cretaceous cobble from Faringdon. These are examples of fossil bioerosion.

Faringdon is the site of the Faringdon Sponge Gravel Member, part of the Cretaceous Lower Greensand Group. It is rich in fossil sponges, other invertebrates, a few vertebrate bones and teeth, and good examples of bioerosion.

== Transport ==
=== Roads ===
The £1.6-million 3-mile (5 km) A420 Faringdon Bypass was opened in July 1979.

=== Buses ===
Stagecoach West operate a service between Swindon, Shrivenham, Watchfield, Faringdon, Buckland, Southmoor, Besselsleigh, Botley and Oxford. Thames Travel operates services to Stanford in the Vale, Childrey, Uffington, East Challow and Wantage.

=== Railway ===
A 3.5 miles (5.6 km) Faringdon branch line was opened in 1864 between Faringdon and the Great Western Railway (GWR) at Uffington, with construction funded by the Faringdon Railway Company (bought outright by the GWR in 1886). Passenger traffic peaked in 1913, but later declined to an extent that the passenger service was withdrawn in 1951. Goods traffic continued until the Beeching closures of 1964. The Faringdon railway station building remains. It currently houses a nursery school.

== Media ==
Local news and television programmes are provided by BBC South and ITV Meridian. Television signals are received from the Oxford TV transmitter.

Local radio stations are BBC Radio Oxford, Heart South, Greatest Hits Radio and Witney Radio.

The town is served by the local newspapers the Herald Series and the Oxfordshire Guardian.

== Cultural pursuits ==
Faringdon is notable for the dyed pigeons at Faringdon House. The custom of dyeing pigeons was started by the eccentric Lord Berners. Around the town can be seen stone plaques with comments such as "Please do not throw stones at this notice", reflecting the ongoing influence of Berners. Since 2004, Faringdon has held an annual weekend festival known originally as the "Faringdon Arts Festival", now as "FollyFest". It is generally held as a non-profit event on the last summer weekend of the school year.

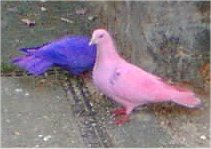
Dyed pigeons at Faringdon House

=== Notable residents ===
- Hugh Cook of Faringdon (died 1539), Benedictine monk, last abbot of Reading Abbey.
- William Hoare of Bath (c.1707–1792), portraitist, painter and printmaker.
- Henry James Pye (1745–1813), Poet Laureate from 1790 until his death, inherited Faringdon House from his father (also Henry).
- Arturo Barea (1897–1957), Spanish journalist, writer and broadcaster who went into exile in 1938 during the Spanish Civil War and settled in England in 1939. He lived for ten years in Faringdon, where he is buried.
- Mark Haskins (born 1988), an international professional wrestler who fights as the "Star Attraction", was brought up in Faringdon and has family in the town.
- Leonard Simbarashe Rwodzi (born 1999), known professionally as S1mba, songwriter, singer and rapper, was brought up in Faringdon and has family in the town.

== Twin towns – sister cities ==
Faringdon is twinned with:

- Le Mêle-sur-Sarthe, France (since 1992)

== See also ==
- Longworth Hospital

== Sources ==
- Page, William; Ditchfield, PH, eds. (1924). A History of the County of Berkshire. Victoria County History. Vol. IV. assisted by John Hautenville Cope. London: The St Katherine Press. pp. 489–499.
- Goodrich, PJ (1928). Great Faringdon: Past and Present. Oxford: privately circulated.
- Pevsner, Nikolaus (1966). Berkshire. The Buildings of England. Harmondsworth: Penguin Books. pp. 139–142.
