= Ashdown Park =

UK Site of Special Scientific Interest

Coordinates: 51.536°N 1.592°W

- Site of Special Scientific Interest
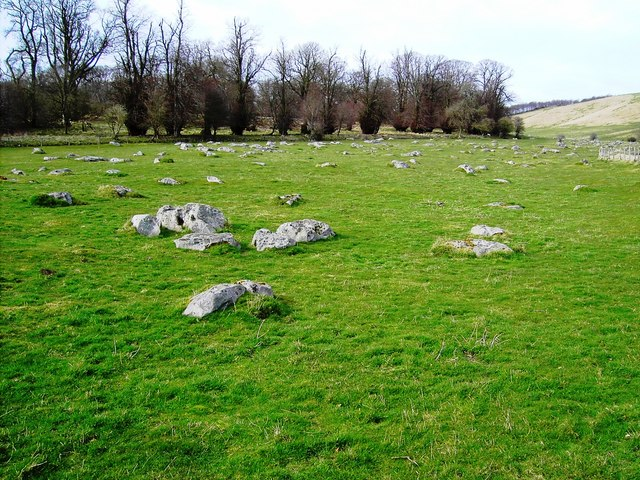
- Location of Ashdown Park.
- Area of search: Oxfordshire
- Grid reference: SU 284 820
- Interest: Biological
- Area: 9.3 hectares (23 acres)
- Notification date: 1986
- Location map: Magic Map

Ashdown Park is a 9.3-hectare (23-acre) biological Site of Special Scientific Interest (SSSI) south of Ashbury in Oxfordshire. The SSSI is part of the park of Ashdown House.

The park has been designated an SSSI because of the lichens on its many sarsen boulders. These are in parkland which is heavily grazed to ensure that the lichens, which have taken centuries to grow, do not become shaded. Noteworthy species include Aspicilia caesiocinerea, Buellia saxorum, Candelariella coralliza, Rinodina atrocinerea and Parmelia loxodes.

The park is owned by the National Trust and is open to the public.
