= Bourton, Vale of White Horse =

Village in Oxfordshire, England

Coordinates: 51.582°N 1.667°W

Bourton
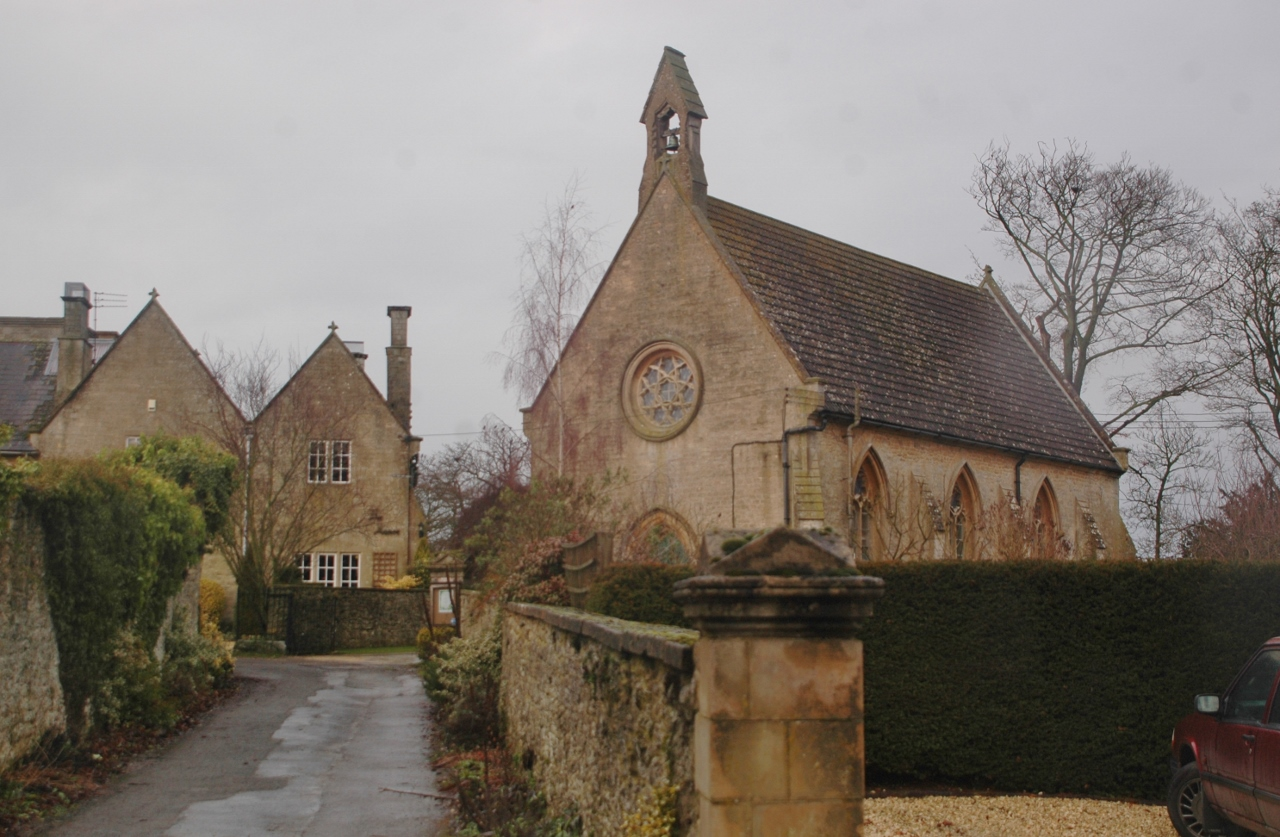
- Former Baptist church, now the village hall

- Location within Oxfordshire
- Area: 5.51 km^{2} (2.13 sq mi)
- Population: 363 (2021)
  - Density: 66/km^{2} (170/sq mi)
- OS grid reference: SU231870
- Civil parish: Bourton
- District: Vale of White Horse
- Shire county: Oxfordshire
- Region: South East
- Country: England
- Sovereign state: United Kingdom
- Post town: Swindon
- Postcode district: SN6
- Dialling code: 01793
- Police: Thames Valley
- Fire: Oxfordshire
- Ambulance: South Central
- UK Parliament: Witney
- Website: bourton-oxon.org.uk

Bourton is a village and civil parish in the Vale of White Horse, England, about 4 miles (6.4 km) southeast of Highworth in neighbouring Wiltshire. Bourton was part of the parish of Shrivenham until 1867, and was in Berkshire until the 1974 local government boundary changes transferred the Vale of White Horse to Oxfordshire. The 2011 Census recorded the parish population as 326.

== Geography ==
Bourton lies at the western end of the Vale of White Horse. The western boundary of the parish is also the county boundary with Wiltshire. In the northwest the boundary follows the River Cole, and in the southwest it follows a stream which joins the Cole.

== Manor ==
Bourton seems to have begun as part of the manor of Shrivenham. Its toponym evolved from Burghton in the 14th century via Borton in the 17th century and has appeared also as Burton. In 1476 George Talbot, 4th Earl of Shrewsbury was feudal overlord of the manor of Buckand in Over Bourton. The manor had been held by Sir William Lovel, Lord Morley, who died in that year. In 1529 the manor was recorded as being "late of Sir Francis Lovell", who was attainted in 1485 for supporting Richard III and died childless in 1487. The manor was still owned by the Crown in 1529 but was leased from 1542. From then until 1664 the Hinton family held the manor, but no subsequent record of it is known.

== Economic history ==
At the centre of Bourton village are the remains of a 14th-century stone cross. The base stands on three square stone steps. The top of the cross has been lost but most of the shaft survives. Stone crosses marked a site for either open-air preaching or a regular public market. Historic England considers Bourton's cross to be for the latter. It is a scheduled monument. Bourton's common lands were enclosed in 1792. After the First World War the Swindon – Faringdon main road was classified as the A420. Later in the 20th century the road through Acorn Bridge was widened and realigned to relieve the S-bend by which the road passes under the railway. The westbound carriageway was re-routed through the easterly arch that is no longer used by the canal, and the westerly arch remained in use by only the eastbound carriageway.

In 1804–05 the Wilts & Berks Canal was extended eastwards from Swindon to Longcot. The canal passed through the northern part of Bourton parish, and Bourton Wharf was built beside the main road between Swindon and Faringdon. The canal supplied coal mainly from the Somerset Coalfield and smaller amounts from the Forest of Dean Coalfield and Moira. Despite railway competition, Bourton Wharf's trade continued to increase until 1848, when 823 long tons of Somerset coal were landed there. Thereafter however the railway increasingly dominated coal and other freight traffic, and trade at Bourton Wharf declined rapidly.

Bourton Wharf had a small revival in the 1860s but in 1876 the wharf received only 27 tons of Somerset coal, which equates to a full cargo for only one narrowboat in the entire year. Bourton Wharf handled small amounts of cargo in the mid-1890s, at least some of which was local traffic to or from Melksham and Wantage. By this time the Wilts & Berks' maintenance and dredging had deteriorated to the extent that narrowboats could not operate fully laden. In 1901 the Stanley Aqueduct over the River Marden in Wiltshire collapsed and the little remaining traffic virtually ceased. The Wilts & Berks Canal was formally abandoned in 1914.

The Great Western Main Line railway was built through the parish in 1840, passing just north of Lower Bourton. Shrivenham railway station was opened 1/2 mile (800 m) north-east of Bourton village on the boundary between the two parishes. Acorn Bridge was built for the Great Western in the western part of Bourton parish close to the Wiltshire county boundary. It is a brick bridge, built askew, and is a "double bridge", i.e. it has two arches. The easterly one spanned the canal and the westerly one spanned the Swindon – Faringdon main road. Shrivenham railway station continued to serve Bourton and Shrivenham until 1964, when British Railways withdrew all local passenger services between Didcot and Swindon and closed all intermediate stations including Shrivenham.

== Social history ==
Bourton House was built in 1845. It is now the premises of Pinewood School, a co-educational preparatory school founded in 1875. Cleycourt Manor, formerly known as Bourton Grange, is a Grade II Listed manor house dating back to 1847, built in Jacobean Dutch style, by the Tucker family. The Tuckers endowed the Bourton village school which was built in 1842 It was later extended with the addition of a second classroom. It was still open after 1920 but has since closed. The Tuckers also established six almshouses in 1847 and contributed to the rebuilding of the parish church.

== Churches ==
Bourton Baptist Church was built in 1851 for the owner of Bourton House. It is a Gothic revival building, emulating Decorated Gothic. It is now the village hall. The Church of England parish church of St James was designed by J.W. Hugall and is another Gothic Revival building. Page and Ditchfield state that it was built in 1881, but Nikolaus Pevsner states that it was built in 1860. St James' parish is now part of the Church of England Benefice of Shrivenham and Ashbury, which also includes Compton Beauchamp, Fernham, Longcot and Watchfield. Low attendance and a parish deficit of £6,000 per year led the Diocese of Oxford to serve notice at the end of 2003 to make St. James' redundant. Increased attendance and a £2,000 increase in parish income from January 2004 onwards led the Diocese to rescind the notice by June of that year.

== Gallery ==
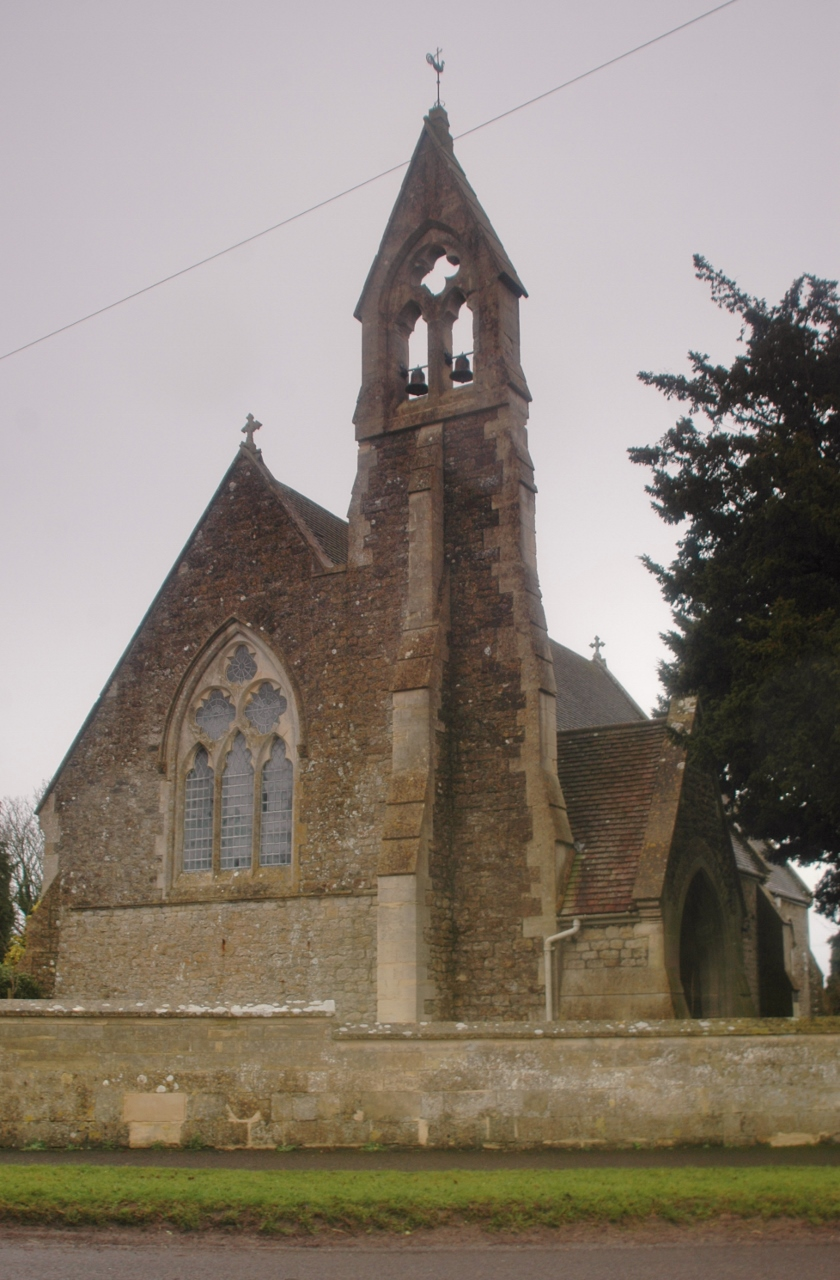
St James' parish church

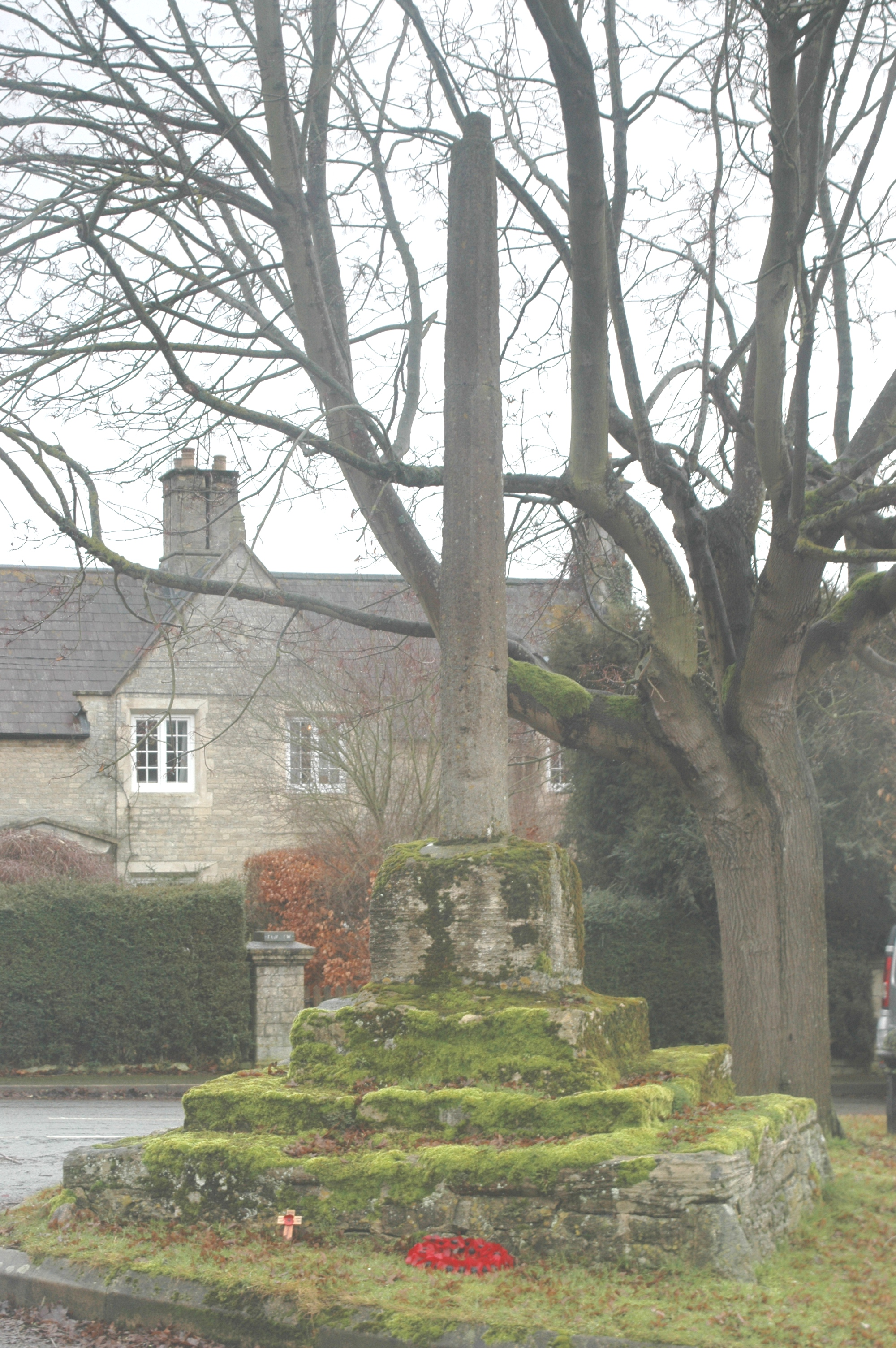
Base and shaft of Medieval cross

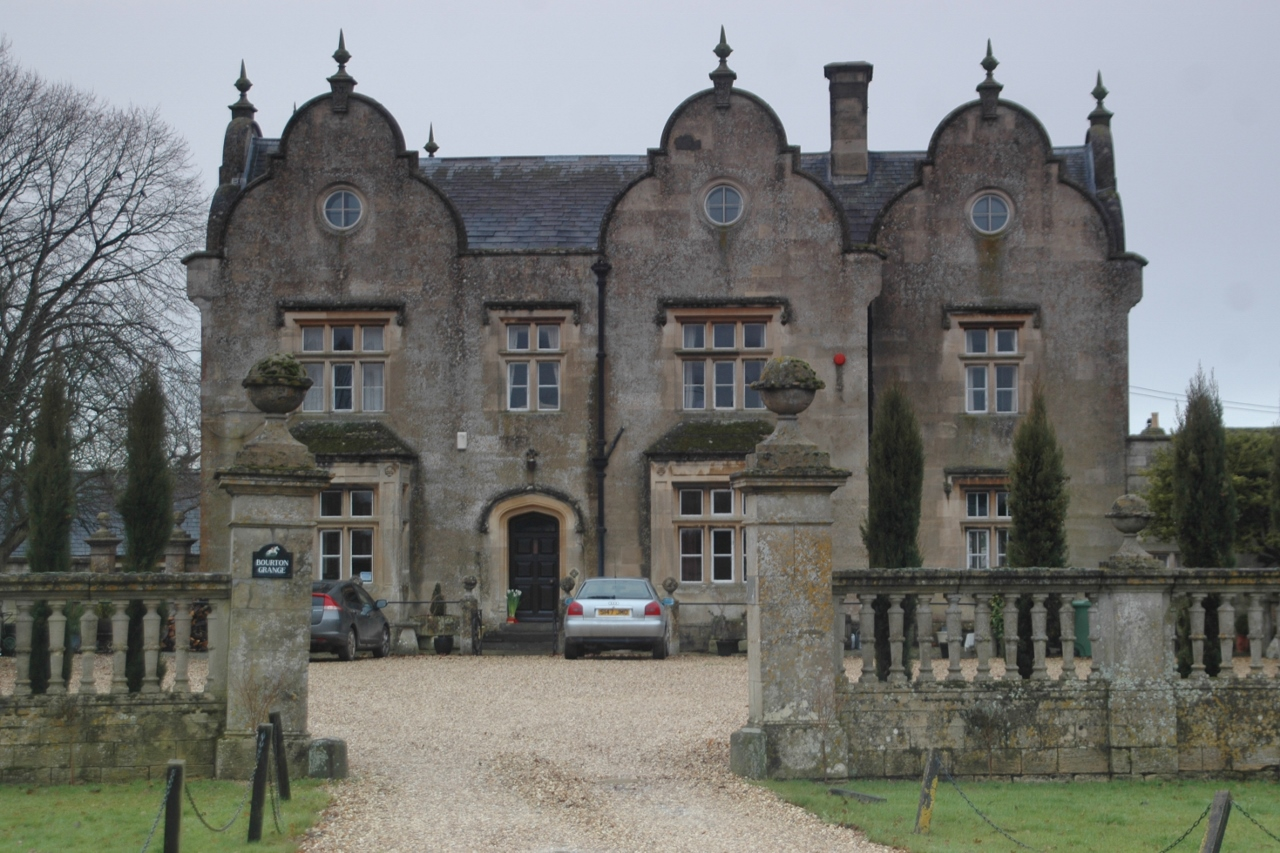
Bourton Grange in Lower Bourton

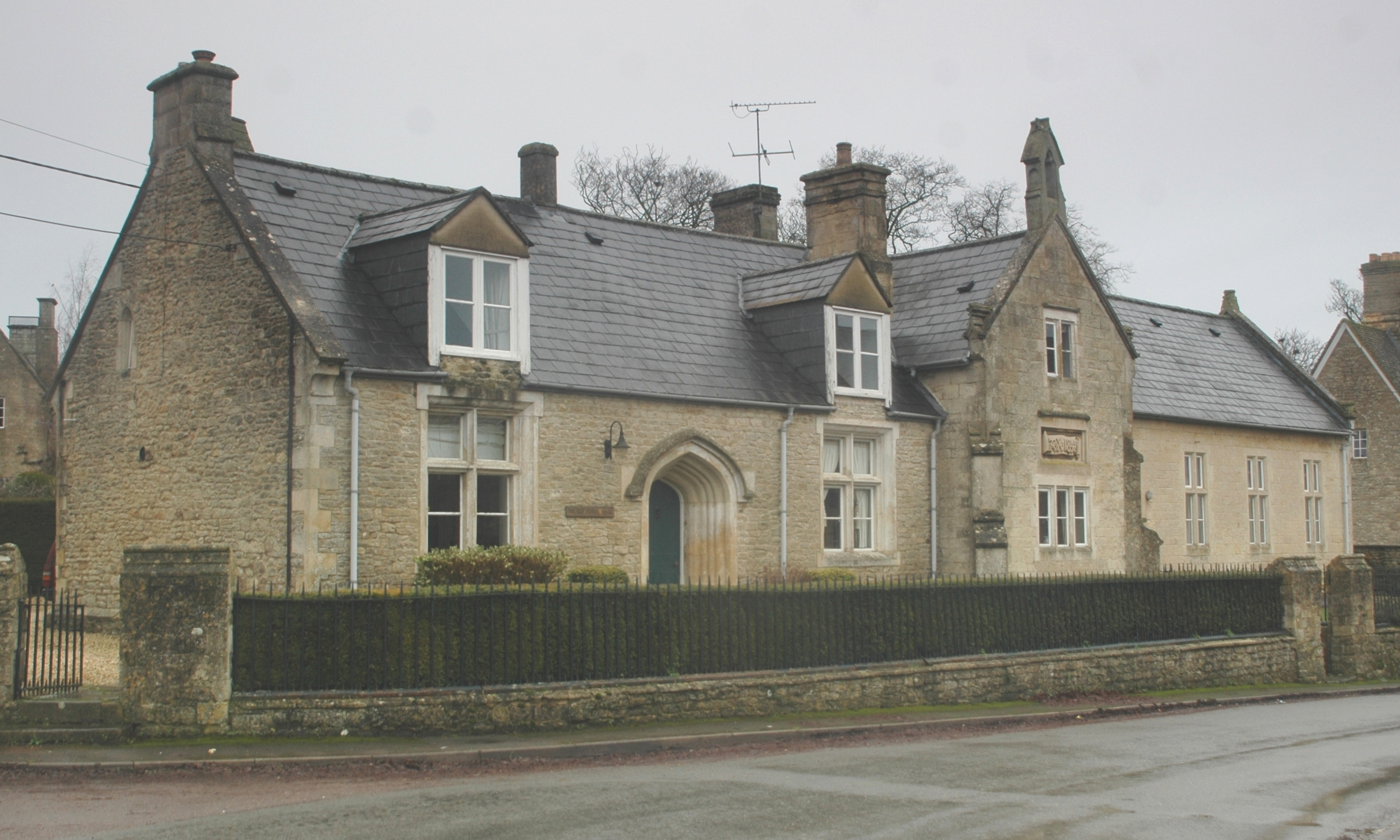
Former village school, now a private home

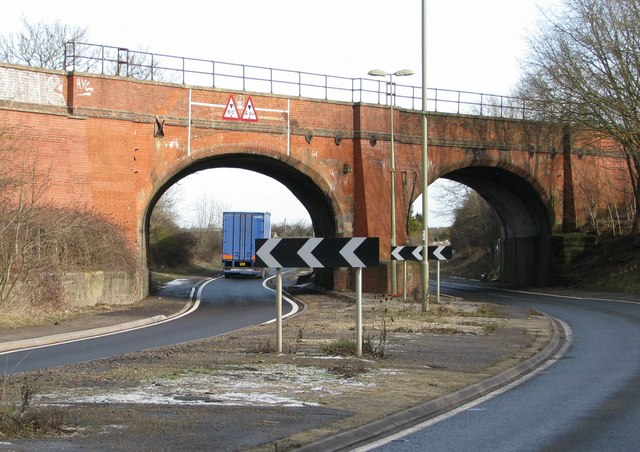
Acorn bridge carries the Great Western Main Line across the A420 road. The carriageway on the right uses the arch that originally spanned the Wilts & Berks Canal.

== Sources ==
- Dalby, L.J. (2000) [1971]. The Wilts and Berks Canal (3rd ed.). Usk: Oakwood Press. pp. 23, 119, 123, 124. ISBN 0-85361-562-4.
- Page, W.H.; Ditchfield, P.H., eds. (1924). A History of the County of Berkshire. Victoria County History. Vol. 4. assisted by John Hautenville Cope. London: The St Katherine Press. pp. 531–543.
- Pevsner, Nikolaus (1966). Berkshire. The Buildings of England. Harmondsworth: Penguin Books. p. 92.
