= Longcot =

Village in Oxfordshire, England

Coordinates: 51.616°N 1.605°W

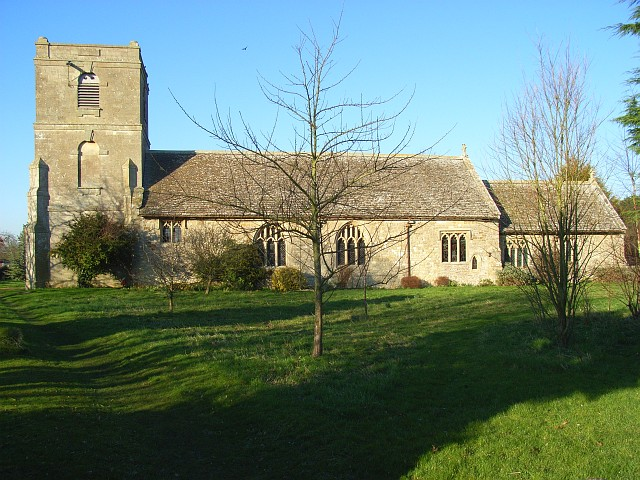
- St Mary's parish church

- Location within Oxfordshire
- Population: 617 (2011 Census)
- OS grid reference: SU2790
- Civil parish: Longcot
- District: Vale of White Horse
- Shire county: Oxfordshire
- Region: South East
- Country: England
- Sovereign state: United Kingdom
- Post town: Faringdon
- Postcode district: SN7
- Dialling code: 01793
- Police: Thames Valley
- Fire: Oxfordshire
- Ambulance: South Central
- UK Parliament: Witney
- Website: Longcot Village

Longcot is a village and civil parish in the Vale of White Horse District. It was part of Berkshire until the 1974 boundary changes transferred it to Oxfordshire. The village is about 3 miles (5 km) south of Faringdon and about 2.5 miles (4 km) northeast of Shrivenham. The A420 road between Swindon and Oxford passes through the parish 1 mile (1.6 km) northwest of the village. The 2011 Census recorded the parish's population as 617.

== Geography ==
Longcot Civil Parish covers 1,894 acres (766 ha). It is in a wide bend of the nascent River Ock, in typical low-lying vale landscape. The view to the south is dominated by the scarp of the Lambourn downs, including the Uffington White Horse.

== Parish church ==
The Church of England parish church of Saint Mary the Virgin has a 13th-century Norman nave and chancel. One lancet window on the north side of the chancel is original but all other the current windows were inserted later. On the north side of the church they include one two-light Decorated Gothic and one four-light Perpendicular Gothic window. The pulpit is Jacobean. The tower was rebuilt in 1721 or 1722. Abraham Rudhall of Gloucester cast five new bells in 1722, followed by the treble bell in 1729 to complete a ring of six. St Mary's is now part of the Church of England Benefice of Shrivenham and Ashbury, which also includes Bourton, Compton Beauchamp, Fernham and Watchfield.

== Economic and social history ==
Longcot (or, until the 20th century, Longcott) was part of Shrivenham Hundred, with the manor and most of the land being held by Viscount Barrington. For most of its history Longcot was an agricultural community, but population growth in the early 19th century began with the arrival of the Wilts & Berks Canal in 1805 and the building of Longcot Wharf, which was the wharf nearest to Faringdon. The village population declined in line with the loss of commercial traffic on the canal to the Great Western Railway, completed in 1841. The canal was formally abandoned by Act of Parliament in 1914.

The parish has had a Church of England school since 1717, the original building in the southwest corner of the churchyard paid for by voluntary subscription. The current school building, built in 1969 opposite The Green on Kings Lane, replaced a previous building on the same site built in 1874. In 2002 Longcot won two categories in Oxfordshire's Best Kept Village competition: "Best Small Village" and "Best Newcomer".

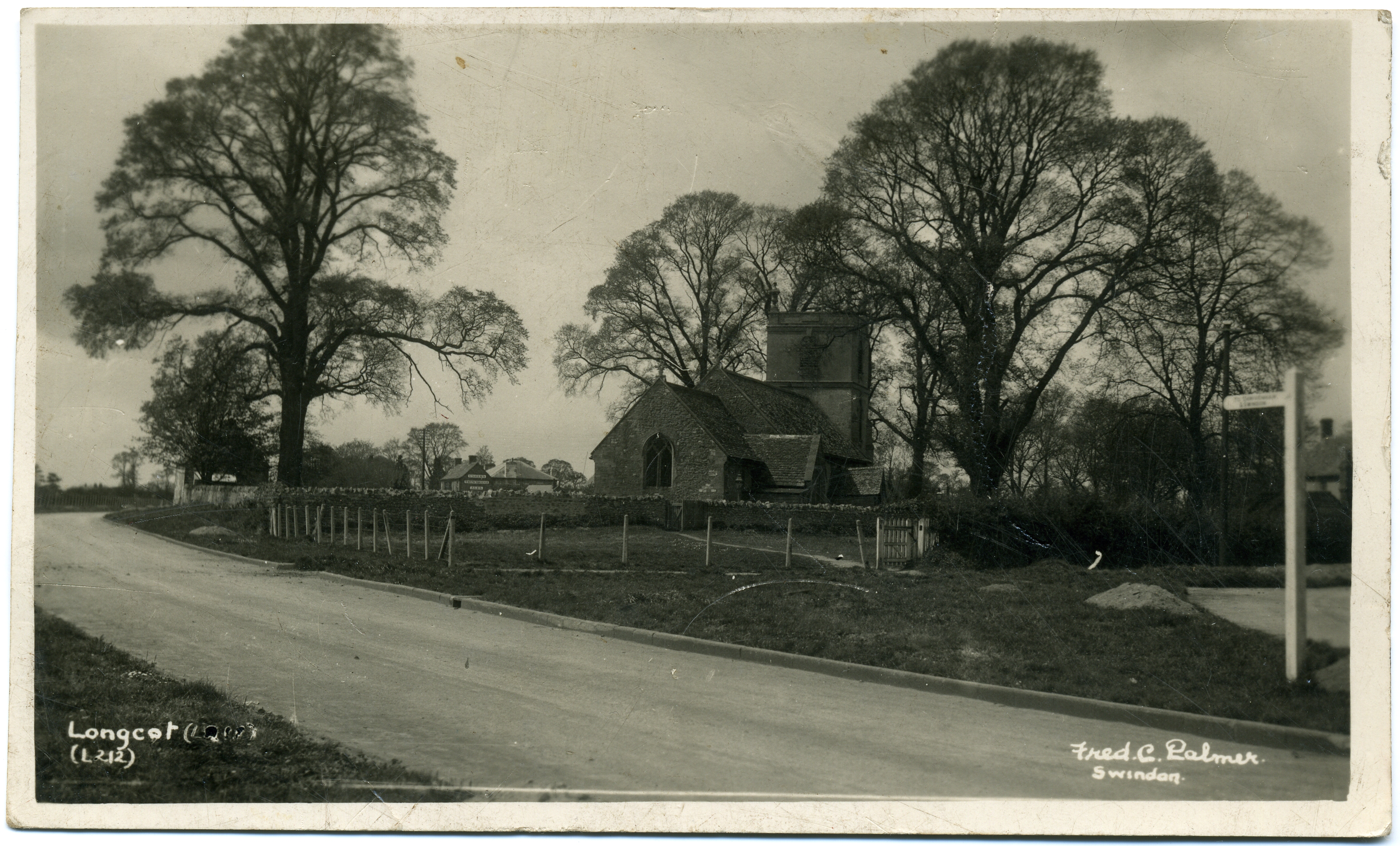
Elm trees by St Mary's parish church, photographed in 1935 by Fred C. Palmer

== Amenities ==
Longcot has a pub, the King and Queen, which is a free house.

== Population ==
The following data has been taken from historical census information in the public domain.

Year	Total	Male	Female	Households
1871	494	229	265	110
1881	393	198	195	92
1891	310	162	148	77
1901	256	139	117	65
1911	334	169	165	77
1921	295	146	149	71
1931	264	139	125	76
1941	No census taken			
1951	285	143	142	88
1961	337	173	164	102
1971	446			
1981				
1991				
2001	574	290	284	220

== Sources and further reading ==
- Dalby, L.J. (2000) [1971]. The Wilts & Berks Canal (3rd ed.). Usk: Oakwood Press. p. 23. ISBN 0-85361-562-4.
- Page, W.H.; Ditchfield, P.H., eds. (1924). A History of the County of Berkshire. Victoria County History. Vol. 4. assisted by John Hautenville Cope. London: The St Katherine Press. pp. 466–471.
- Pevsner, Nikolaus (1966). Berkshire. The Buildings of England. Harmondsworth: Penguin Books. pp. 171–172.
- Richards, Guy; Dalton-Morris, Shirley (3 March 1999). Longcot: A Village in the Vale. S. Dalton-Morris. ISBN 0-9536602-0-6.
