= Idstone =

Hamlet in Oxfordshire, England

Coordinates: 51.556°N 1.631°W

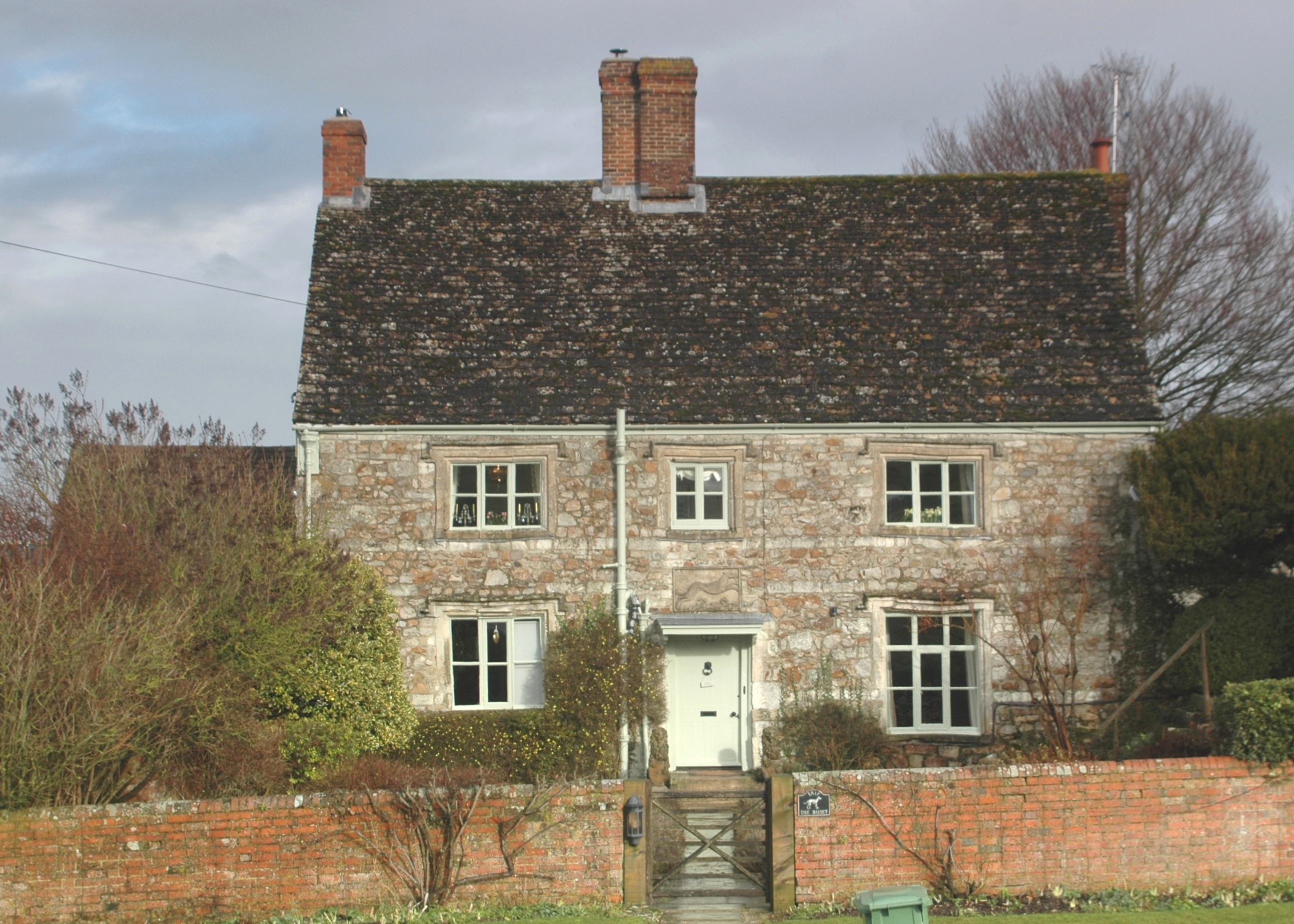
- Trip the Daisey, former public house

- Location within Oxfordshire
- OS grid reference: SU2584
- Civil parish: Ashbury
- District: Vale of White Horse
- Shire county: Oxfordshire
- Region: South East
- Country: England
- Sovereign state: United Kingdom
- Post town: SWINDON
- Postcode district: SN6
- Dialling code: 01793
- Police: Thames Valley
- Fire: Oxfordshire
- Ambulance: South Central
- UK Parliament: Witney
- Website: Ashbury Parish News

Idstone is a hamlet in the civil parish of Ashbury in the Vale of White Horse. Idstone was part of Berkshire until the 1974 boundary changes transferred the Vale of White Horse to Oxfordshire. Idstone is about 6 miles (10 km) east of Swindon in neighbouring Wiltshire.

== Archaeology ==
The Three Barrows are bowl barrows on Idstone Down about 2.5 miles (4 km) south-east of the hamlet and about 0.75 miles (1.2 km) south-west of Ashdown House.

== History ==
Idstone's toponym has evolved from the Old English Edwineston in the 12th century through Edyston and Edwiston in the 15th century, Edston in the 16th century and Idston, Hidston, Geston or Jeston in the 17th century. The form Edwinston seems to have been in use until the 19th or 20th century. In the 12th century the manor of Edwineston was assessed at three hides and the Benedictine Abbot of Glastonbury was the feudal overlord. The Trip the Daisey Inn was built late in the 17th century. It is now a private house.

== Sources ==
- Page, W.H.; Ditchfield, P.H., eds. (1924). A History of the County of Berkshire, Volume 4. Victoria County History. pp. 503–512.
- Pevsner, Nikolaus (1966). Berkshire. The Buildings of England. Harmondsworth: Penguin Books. p. 158.
