= Fernham =

Village in Oxfordshire, England

Coordinates: 51.625°N 1.580°W

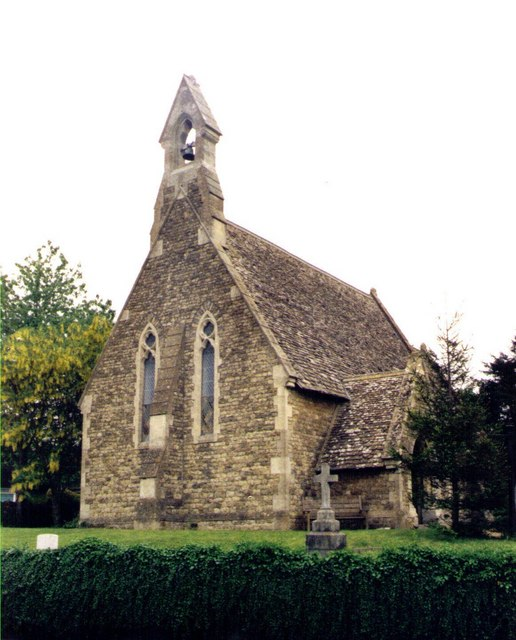
- St John the Evangelist parish church

- Location within Oxfordshire
- Population: 208 (2001 census)
- OS grid reference: SU292919
- District: Vale of White Horse
- Shire county: Oxfordshire
- Region: South East
- Country: England
- Sovereign state: United Kingdom
- Post town: Faringdon
- Postcode district: SN7
- Dialling code: 01367
- Police: Thames Valley
- Fire: Oxfordshire
- Ambulance: South Central
- UK Parliament: Witney
- Website: Fernham Oxfordshire

Fernham is a village and civil parish about 2 miles (3 km) south of Faringdon in the Vale of White Horse, Oxfordshire, England. Fernham was historically part of the parish of Shrivenham. It was within Berkshire until the 1974 local authority boundary changes transferred the Vale of White Horse to Oxfordshire.

== Manor ==
The manor of Fernham was in existence by the first half of the 13th century, when Juliana de Elsefeld quitclaimed six virgates of land at Fernham to William de Valence, 1st Earl of Pembroke. The Earl supported Henry III, but the rebel Simon de Montfort, 6th Earl of Leicester, defeated the King at the Battle of Lewes in 1264, and thereafter the manors of Shrivenham and Fernham were granted to his wife Joan de Valence, Countess of Pembroke, for her maintenance. Shrivenham and Fernham descended with the same heirs until Richard Talbot, 2nd Baron Talbot, died seised of the reversion of Fernham in 1356.

== Church, chapel and priory ==
Fernham was part of the Church of England parish of Shrivenham until 1846, when it and neighbouring Longcot were formed into a separate ecclesiastical parish. The Church of England parish church of Saint John the Evangelist was designed in 13th-century style by the Gothic Revival architect J.W. Hugall and built in 1861 as a chapel of ease for Longcot. St. John's parish is now part of a single Church of England Benefice with the parishes of Ashbury, Bourton, Compton Beauchamp and Watchfield.

In 2008 the parish controversially spent a £90,000 grant from the Big Lottery Fund to strip St. John's of its Victorian pews, lay a modern floor, and reorder its interior for secular uses as a village hall. Fernham had a Congregational chapel. From 1966 to 2002, a community of Roman Catholic Benedictine nuns had its priory at a former farmstead 1/2 mile (800 m) northwest of the village. Many members then relocated to St Mary's Abbey, Oulton.

== Economic and social history ==
A village school was built in Fernham in 1717 and altered in 1825. It has since merged with the village school in Longcot and its former premises in Fernham are now a parish room. The Faringdon Railway was built through the eastern part of the parish in 1864. It was a broad gauge branch line linking the town of Faringdon with the Great Western Main Line at Uffington. It was converted to standard gauge in 1878 and taken over by the Great Western Railway in 1886. British Railways withdrew passenger services in 1951 and closed the line to freight traffic in 1964. In the winter of 2007–08 Farmer Gow's Activity Centre moved from Appleton to Fernham. It offers family activities based on farming.

== Amenities ==
Fernham has a 17th-century public house, the Woodman Inn.

== Sources ==
- Page, W.H.; Ditchfield, P.H., eds. (1924). A History of the County of Berkshire, Volume 4. Victoria County History. pp. 531–543.
- Pevsner, Nikolaus (1966). Berkshire. The Buildings of England. Harmondsworth: Penguin Books. p. 143.
