= John West Hugall =

English architect (1806–1880)

- Born: c. 1806; Sculcoates, Yorkshire, England
- Died: 30 October 1880 (aged 74); Hastings, Sussex, England
- Occupation: Architect

John West Hugall FRIBA (c. 1806 – 30 October 1880) was an English Gothic Revival architect from Yorkshire.

== Career ==
Hugall's works span the period 1848–78. He was elected a Fellow of the Royal Institute of British Architects in 1871.

He spent an early part of his career in Pontefract, Yorkshire. While there, he was Secretary of the Yorkshire Architectural Society (now the Yorkshire Architectural and York Archaeological Society). He co-wrote two books with the Rev. G.A. Poole: The Churches of Scarborough, Filey, And The Neighbourhood (1848) and An Historical & Descriptive Guide to York Cathedral and Its Antiquities (1850).

Hugall seems to have moved his practice to Cheltenham by about 1850 and to Reading and Oxford by 1871.

== Work ==
=== Buildings ===
- St. Edmund's parish church, Wellingborough Road, Northampton, 1850
- All Saints' parish church, Durrington, Wiltshire, 1851
- St. Michael's parish church, Figheldean, Wiltshire: rebuilt top of bell tower, 1851
- All Saints' parish church, Faringdon, Berkshire (now Oxfordshire): south transept and west chapel, 1853
- St. Cuthbert's parish church, Ackworth, West Yorkshire: renovated nave, 1852–1854
- St. James' parish church, Winterbourne, Berkshire: rebuilt church, 1854
- St. Mary's parish church, Kingskerswell, Devon: restored, c. 1856
- St. Mary's parish church, St Marychurch, Torquay, Devon, 1856–1861 (rebuilt in 1950s after war damage)
- St. Michael's parish church, Highworth, Wiltshire: restoration, 1861–1862
- St. James' parish church, Bourton, Berkshire (now Oxfordshire), 1860 or 1881
- St. John the Evangelist parish church, Fernham, Berkshire (now Oxfordshire), 1861
- All Saints' Church, Lullington, Derbyshire: restoration, 1861–1862
- St. Leonard's parish church, Stanton Fitzwarren, Wiltshire: restoration, 1865
- St Michael and St Mary Magdalene's Church, Easthampstead, Bracknell, Berkshire, 1866–1867
- St. Michael's parish church, Little Marcle, Herefordshire, 1870
- St. Leonard's parish church, Sherfield on Loddon, Hampshire: spire, 1872
- St. Mary's parish church, Chieveley, Berkshire: rebuilt nave, 1873
- St. James' parish church, Welland, Worcestershire, 1875
- All Saints' parish church, East Garston, Berkshire: rebuilt chancel, 1875
- All Saints' parish church, Staunton, Gloucestershire: restoration, 1871–1872

=== Writing ===
- Poole, Rev. George Ayliffe; Hugall, John West (1848). The Churches of Scarborough, Filey, And The Neighbourhood. London: Joseph Masters.
- Poole, Rev. George Ayliffe; Hugall, John West (1850). An Historical & Descriptive Guide to York Cathedral and Its Antiquities. York: R Sunter.

== Sources ==
- Brodie, Antonia; Felstead, Alison; Franklin, Jonathan; Pinfield, Leslie; Oldfield, Jane, eds. (2001). Directory of British Architects 1834–1914, A–K. London & New York: Continuum. p. 970. ISBN 0-8264-5513-1.
- Page, William; Ditchfield, P.H., eds. (1924). Victoria County History: A History of the County of Berkshire, Volume 4.
- Pevsner, Nikolaus (1963). Herefordshire. The Buildings of England. Harmondsworth: Penguin Books. p. 237.
- Pevsner, Nikolaus (1966). Berkshire. The Buildings of England. Harmondsworth: Penguin Books.
- Pevsner, Nikolaus (1968). Worcestershire. The Buildings of England. Harmondsworth: Penguin Books. p. 285.
- Pevsner, Nikolaus; Cherry, Bridget (revision) (1973) [1961]. The Buildings of England: Northamptonshire. Harmondsworth: Penguin Books. ISBN 0-14-071022-1.
- Pevsner, Nikolaus; Cherry, Bridget (revision) (1975) [1963]. Wiltshire. The Buildings of England. Harmondsworth: Penguin Books. ISBN 0-14-071026-4.
- Pevsner, Nikolaus; Cherry, Bridget (revision) (1989) [1952]. Devon. The Buildings of England. Harmondsworth: Penguin Books. ISBN 0-14-071050-7.
- Pevsner, Nikolaus; Lloyd, David (1967). Hampshire and the Isle of Wight. The Buildings of England. Harmondsworth: Penguin Books. p. 502.
