= Ablington =

Ablington may refer to two places in England:

- Ablington, Gloucestershire
- Ablington, Wiltshire
