= Alfred's Castle =

Iron Age hill fort in Ashbury, England

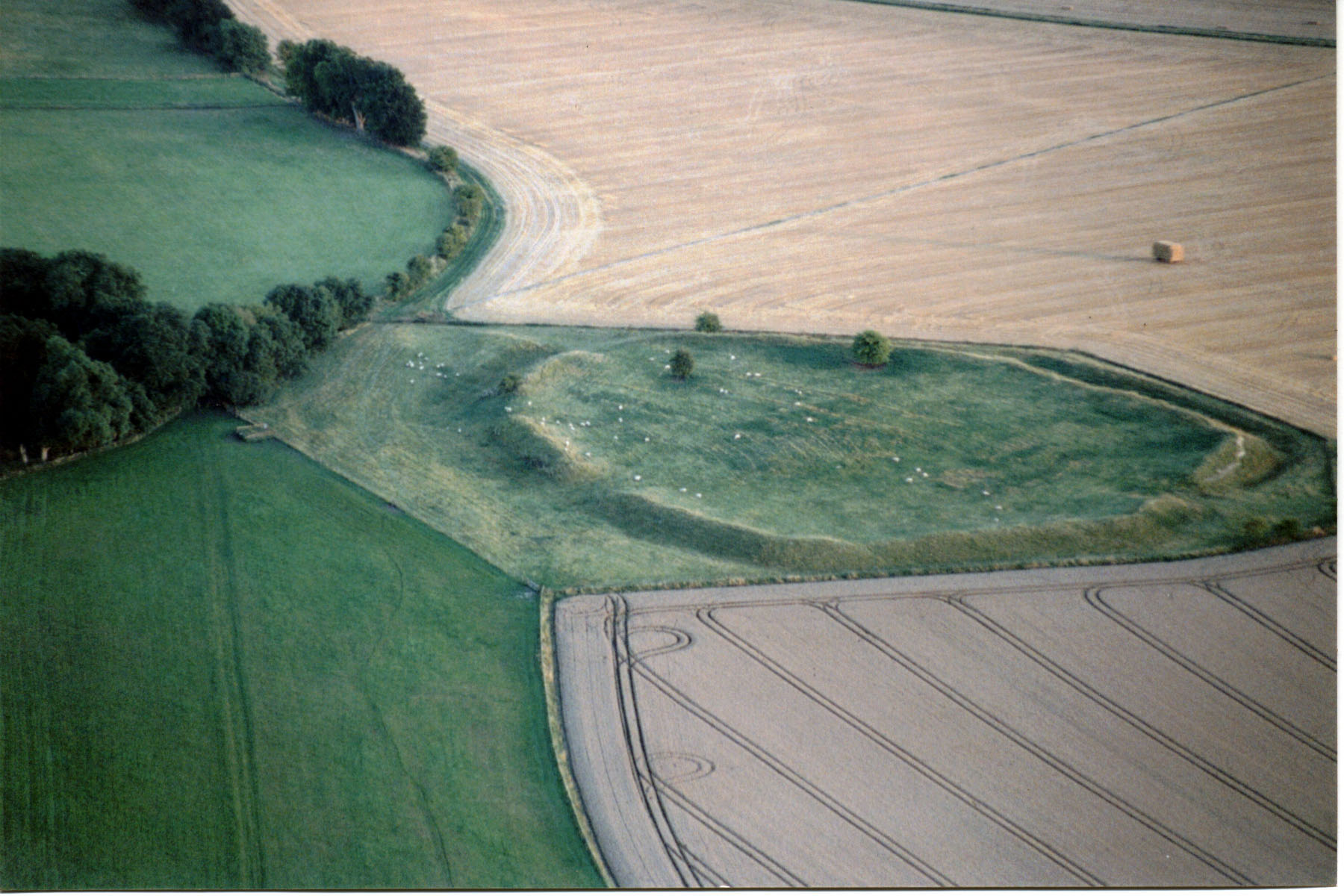
- Aerial view of Alfred's Castle from the north

- Location within Oxfordshire
- 51.53803°N 1.60201°W
- Type: Hillfort and Roman building
- Location: Ashbury, Oxfordshire

Scheduled monument
- Official name: Alfred's Castle univallate hillfort
- Designated: 11 February 1958
- Reference no.: 1015551

Alfred's Castle is a small Iron Age hill fort, situated at grid reference SU277822, behind Ashdown Park in the civil parish of Ashbury in Oxfordshire (formerly Berkshire). It lies 2–3 km south of the Ridgeway and is protected as a Scheduled Ancient Monument.

It has a large enclosure attached that shows as a cropmark. Excavation has shown this to be contemporary with the small enclosure, started in the 6th century BC. The hill fort was established within a series of late Bronze Age linear ditches and revealed much evidence for occupation within it. In the late 1st century, a Romano-British farmhouse was built within the abandoned prehistoric enclosure.

King Alfred won a great victory against the Danes at the Battle of Ashdown, in AD 871. Being located just to the west of Ashdown House, Victorian antiquaries associated Alfred's Castle with the King's troop movements before the battle. The exact site of Alfred's battle has not yet been determined, however, so is a matter for debate. The most likely sites are near Compton and Aldworth in Berkshire.

Excavations were carried out at Alfred's Castle from 1998 to 2000 by archaeologists from Oxford University. A final analysis was published in 2014.

== See also ==
- List of hillforts in England
- List of hillforts in Scotland
- List of hillforts in Wales
