= Figheldean =

Village in Wiltshire, England

Coordinates: 51.224°N 1.782°W

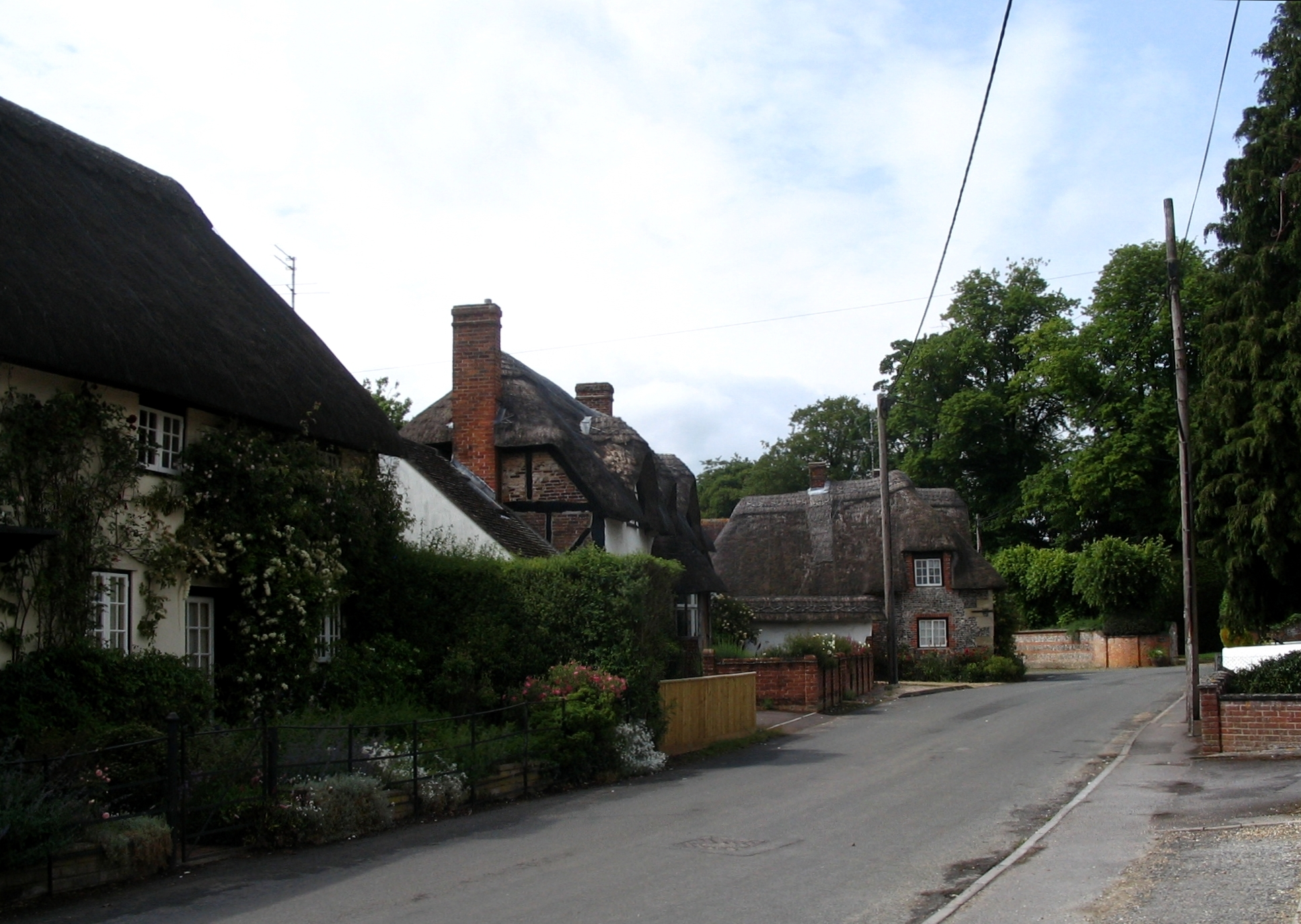
- Figheldean main street, 2007

- Location within Wiltshire
- Population: 628 (in 2011)
- OS grid reference: SU153472
- Civil parish: Figheldean
- Unitary authority: Wiltshire
- Ceremonial county: Wiltshire
- Region: South West
- Country: England
- Sovereign state: United Kingdom
- Post town: Salisbury
- Postcode district: SP4
- Dialling code: 01980
- Police: Wiltshire
- Fire: Dorset and Wiltshire
- Ambulance: South Western
- UK Parliament: East Wiltshire
- Website: Parish Council

Figheldean /faɪlˈdiːn/ is a village and civil parish on the River Avon, 3 1/2 miles (6 km) north of Amesbury in Wiltshire, England.

Figheldean parish extends 3 miles (4.8 km) east of the village towards Tidworth as far as Devil's Ditch and 3 miles (4.8 km) westwards beyond Larkhill towards Shrewton as far as Robin Hood's Ball. The parish includes the hamlets of Ablington and Alton. Approximately 1 mile (1.6 km) to the north is Netheravon and 1.5 miles (2.4 km) to the south is Durrington. The A345 main road between Salisbury and Marlborough passes through the parish to the west of the village.

Figheldean is situated on Salisbury Plain, which supports many nationally rare species and is the largest area of unimproved chalk grassland in northern Europe.

== History ==
Prehistoric sites in the parish include Robin Hood's Ball, a Neolithic causewayed enclosure in the far west of the parish; and Barrow Clump, an early Bronze Age bowl barrow near Ablington. Several other barrows survive on the downs.

There were six settlements near the river, whose names imply Saxon origins: Choulston, Figheldean, Ablington and Syrencot east of the river; Alton and Knighton to the west. The Domesday Book of 1086 recorded a settlement of 21 households at Fisgledene, and smaller settlements at Choulston, Alton and Ablington.

The church at Figheldean is first mentioned in Henry I's 1115 charter granting its lands and revenues to the cathedral at Old Sarum. A church, possibly a parish church, was recorded at Alton from the mid 12th century until the late 16th.

By 1377 there were approximately 160 poll-tax payers in the parish. In the 19th century the population peaked at 531 according to the 1831 census. A National School was built in Figheldean in 1859, with land and building costs provided by the local gentry. From 1898, downland on both sides of the river valley was bought for military use, and remains in Ministry of Defence ownership as part of the Salisbury Plain Training Area.

== Religious sites ==
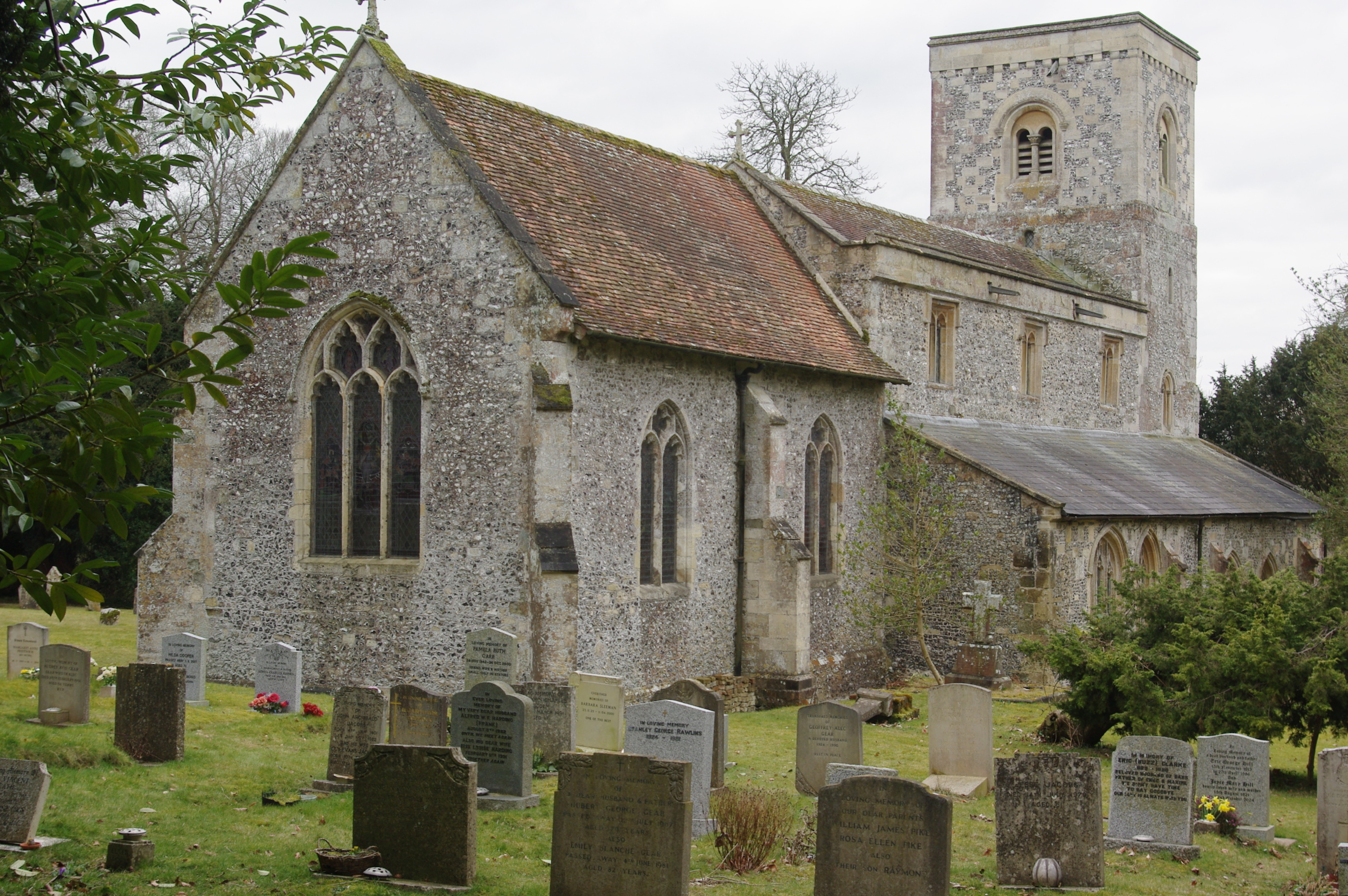
Church of St Michael and All Angels

The Church of England parish church of St Michael and All Angels dates from the 12th century, when it had a nave and a west tower. The surviving feature from that period is the tower arch, following rebuilding and expansion in the next three centuries; in the 15th century the nave roof was raised and the chancel added. The chancel was restored in 1858-9 by Ewan Christian, and the rest of the church was restored in 1859-60 by J.W. Hughall, whose work included heightening the tower and building the vestry.

The tower has two bells from the 16th century and one from the 18th. The church was designated as Grade II* listed in 1958. Today Figheldean is part of the Avon River Team of parishes.

Primitive Methodists were active by 1838 and built a small chapel, of brick and flint, in 1882. The chapel closed sometime before 1971 and became a private house. There was a Catholic church near the airfield, mainly for military personnel, from c. 1934 until 1985 or 1986.

== Notable buildings ==
Syrencot House is a country house in riverside grounds south of Ablington, near the southern boundary of the parish. The three-storey house was built in brick and limestone on the site of an earlier house in 1738, and extended with a large two-storey block in the early 19th century. The estate was bought by the War Office in 1898. During World War II, Syrencot was the residence of Lt-Gen "Boy" Browning, and later became the headquarters of the 6th Airborne Division under General Richard Gale, who was responsible for planning Operation Tonga in support of the Normandy landings. After the war, the house was used for a time as offices, until it was sold in 2000 to Major-General Patrick Sanders. Since 2019, the house has been operated by a subsidiary of Artemis Venue Services as a wedding venue with accommodation.

Figheldean House, southwest of the church, was built c. 1840-60 on the site of an earlier manor house. It is a two-storey L-shaped house in roughcast brick, with a thatched roof.

== Airfield ==
Netheravon Airfield is largely in Fittleton parish but extends southwards into Figheldean. A grass strip airfield was created for the Royal Flying Corps northeast of Coulston Camp (later called Airfield Camp) in 1913 and later became RAF Netheravon, an operational and training base. It was the home of No. 1 Flying Training School RAF from 1919 until 1931, and during the Second World War was used again for training and as a short-term base for operational squadrons, with glider and parachute activity from 1941. In 1963 the airfield and camp were transferred to the Army, and became AAC Netheravon (Army Air Corps) from 1966 until 2012.

The Officers' Mess and Quarters built in 1914 at Airfield Camp are within the parish and are Grade II* listed.

The camp is today used as a parachute centre, on weekdays for the Joint Services Parachute Centre (JSPC) and at weekends for the Army Parachute Association (APA).

== Amenities ==
Figheldean has a large village hall, built in 2000. An annual fair at the hall and field attracts 2,000-3,000 people.

The village school continues as St Michael's CofE Primary School, which since 2016 has been part of the Salisbury Plain Academies trust.

== Economy ==
The village houses a bus and coach depot for Tourist Group. Founded as Tourist Coaches in the village in 1920 to provide services for military establishments, the business is now part of the Go-Ahead Group.
