= Hardwell Castle =

- Hardwell Camp
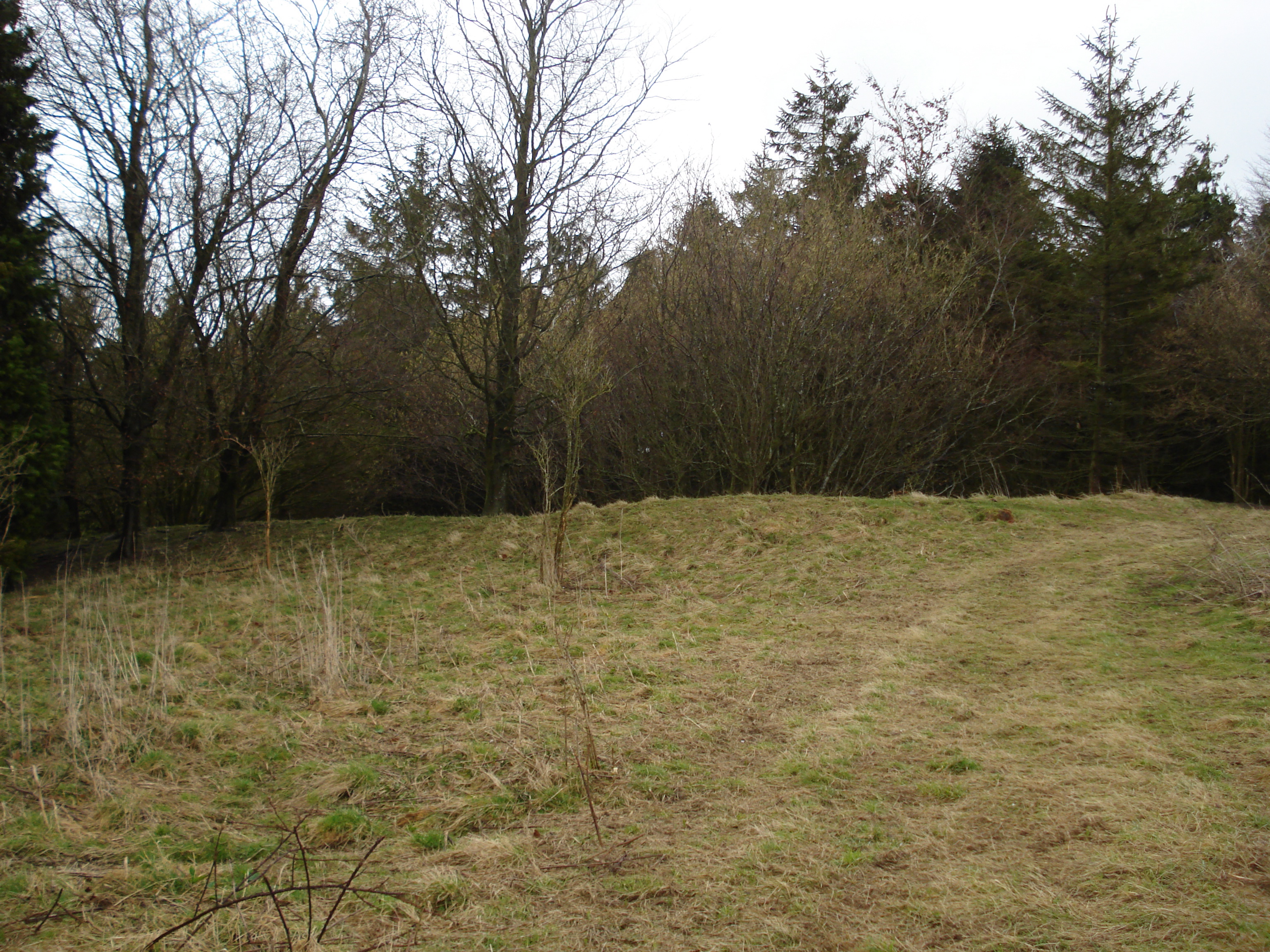

- Location within Oxfordshire
- 51.57844°N 1.58723°W
- Type: Hillfort
- Location: Compton Beauchamp, Oxfordshire

Scheduled monument
- Official name: Hardwell Camp promontory fort
- Designated: 18 August 1958
- Reference no.: 1017820

Hardwell Castle or Hardwell Camp is an Iron Age valley fort in the civil parish of Compton Beauchamp in Oxfordshire (previously Berkshire).

== Position ==
Like nearby Cherbury Camp, Hardwell Castle is not clearly in a strategic or easily defended position. It lies halfway down the scarp slope of the White Horse Hills and is tucked away in a curve, invisible from most angles. This particular positioning suggests its builders had a specialist purpose in mind, although exactly what that may have been remains a mystery.

== Description ==
According to Historic England's scheduling record, the fort encloses an area of roughly 200 m^{2} (2,150 sq ft), using a combination of rampart banks, ditches and enhanced natural features. An 1872 travellers' handbook described the site's double vallum as 140 by 180 feet (40 by 50 m) in dimension (working out to 25,200 sq ft (2,340 m^{2})). It is 'multi-vallate', like Cherbury Camp.

== Status ==
The site is unexcavated and therefore very little is known about it. It is described as a promontory fort by Historic England, and has been a Scheduled Monument since 1958.

== Location ==
The site is at grid reference SU287867 in the Vale of White Horse, very close to the small settlements of both Compton Beauchamp and Knighton, 2 miles (3.2 km) from Uffington and 1 mile (1.6 km) from the hilltop Uffington Castle.
