= Ashbury, Oxfordshire =

Village in Oxfordshire, England

Coordinates: 51.564°N 1.619°W

Ashbury
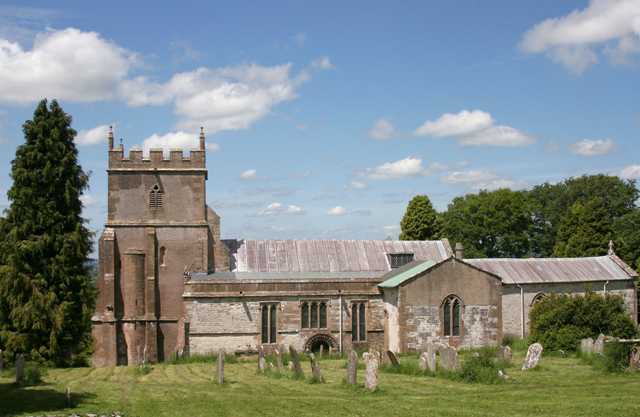
- St Mary the Virgin parish church

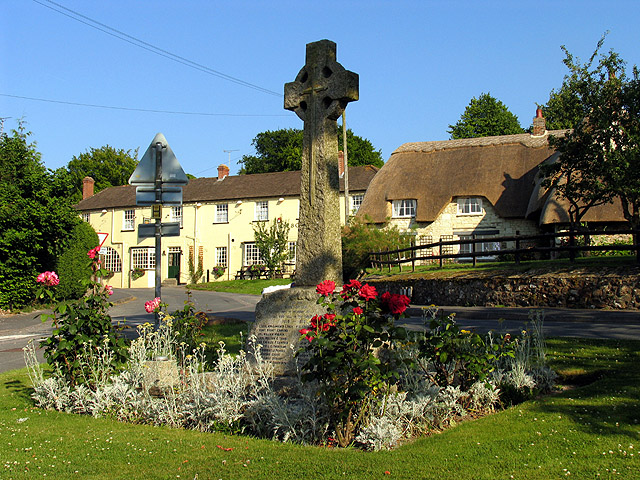
- War memorial and public green with neighbouring houses.

- Location within Oxfordshire
- Area: 22.47 km^{2} (8.68 sq mi)
- Population: 506 (2011 Census)
  - Density: 23/km^{2} (60/sq mi)
- OS grid reference: SU2685
- Civil parish: Ashbury
- District: Vale of White Horse
- Shire county: Oxfordshire
- Region: South East
- Country: England
- Sovereign state: United Kingdom
- Post town: Swindon
- Postcode district: SN6
- Dialling code: 01793
- Police: Thames Valley
- Fire: Oxfordshire
- Ambulance: South Central
- UK Parliament: Witney
- Website: Ashbury Parish News

Ashbury is a village and large civil parish at the upper end (west) of the Vale of White Horse. It is part of the historic county of Berkshire but became administratively a part of Oxfordshire in the Local Government Act 1972. The village is centred 7 miles (11 km) east of Swindon in neighbouring Wiltshire. The parish includes the hamlets of Idstone and Kingstone Winslow. The 2011 Census recorded the parish's population as 506.

== Geography ==
The parish rises from an alluvial plain in the north to an escarpment in the south. Soils are shallow on the chalkland of the North Wessex Downs Area of Outstanding Natural Beauty in the southern part of the parish. Five small tributaries of the north-flowing Cole rise in the central strip of the parish and flow northwards.

== Archaeology ==
The Neolithic burial site of Wayland's Smithy is in the parish 1 mile (1.6 km) east of the village.

== History ==
The earliest known record of Ashbury is from 840, when King Æthelwulf of Wessex granted land at Aisshedoune to his minister Duda. In subsequent charters the toponym evolved as Æcesbyrig in 856, Aysshedoune in 947, Æcesburuh in 953 and 960 and Eissesberie in the 11th century. After 953 the manor of Ashbury was granted to Glastonbury Abbey, which then held it until the Dissolution of the Monasteries in 1539. A deer park was established for the Abbey in the south of the parish. It is bounded by an ancient embankment enclosing a rounded area characteristic of Medieval parks. It may equate to the Aysshen Wood recorded in a terrier of the parish in 1519 as covering 415 acres (168 ha). The former deer park is now the Upper Wood of Ashdown Park. The first free school outside of Crown patronage in the United Kingdom was founded in Ashbury by the curate Thomas Stock in 1777 in collaboration with his colleague Robert Raikes. Monuments to Thomas Stock are in the medieval-founded church.

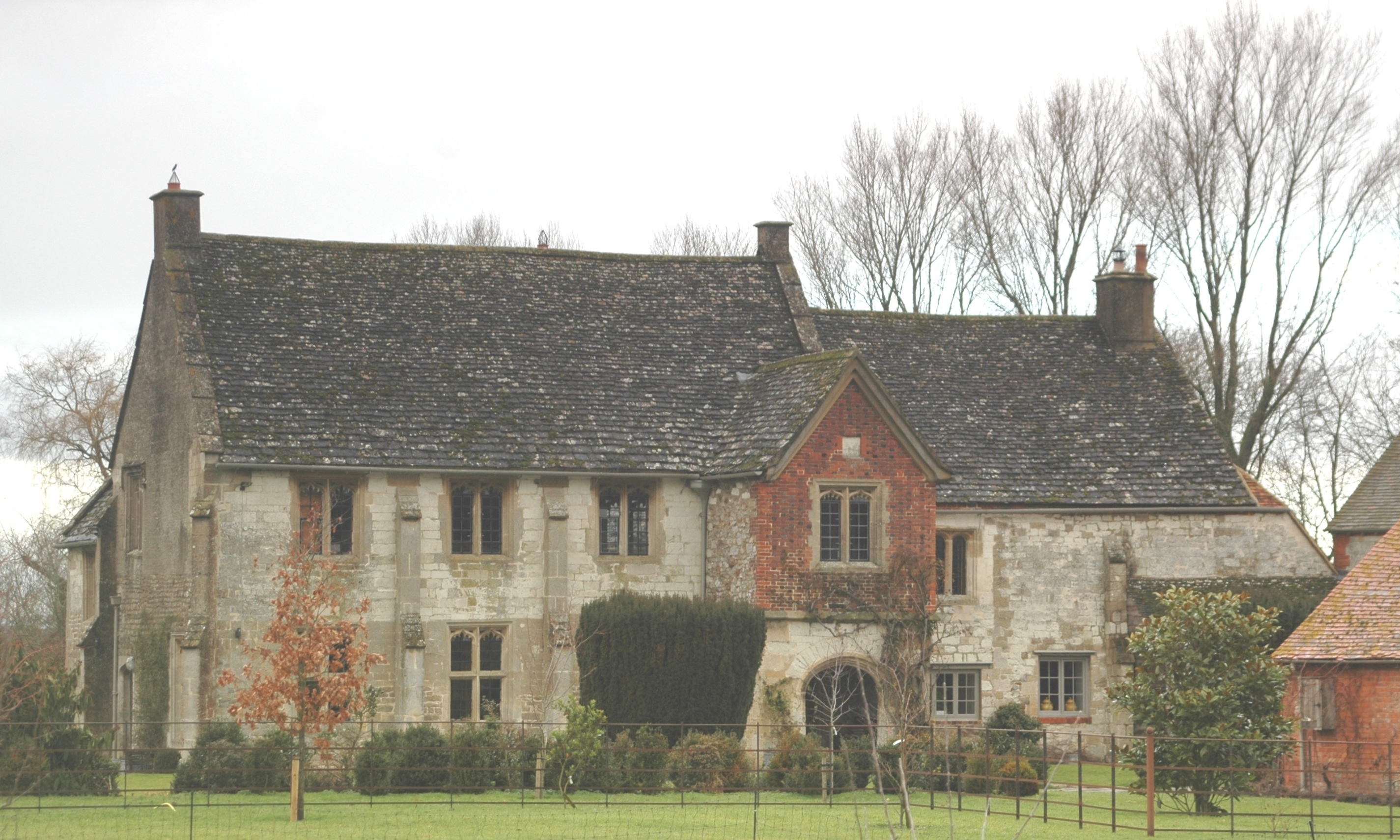
15th-century manor house

== Landmarks ==
Ashbury Manor House was built in the 15th century. The upper brick storey of its porch was added in 1697, which is also the likely date that the chimneys were added. The house is a Grade II* listed building. Ashdown House, which was built in around 1660, is in the parish about 2 miles (3 km) south of the village. It is a Grade I listed building. In the north-east of the village, which is otherwise almost square, is Kingstone farm and with its large indoor livestock areas employs a small minority of the population.

== Places of worship ==
=== Church of England ===
The Church of England parish church of Saint Mary was originally Norman but was rebuilt in the 13th century. Thomas Stock pioneered the first Sunday school in England during 1777, with the first Sunday school being held in the chancel of the Church. In the 20th century the artist Martin Travers converted the north transept into a chapel of Saint Hubert in memory of Evelyn, Countess Craven who had lived at Ashdown House in the parish. The church is a Grade I listed building. St Mary's parish is now part of the Benefice of Shrivenham and Ashbury, which also includes the parishes of Bourton, Compton Beauchamp, Fernham, Longcot and Watchfield. The west tower has a ring of six bells. Henry III Bagley of Chacombe, Northamptonshire cast the second, third and fourth bells in 1733. W&J Taylor cast the fifth and tenor bells in 1845, probably at the bell-foundry they had in Oxford at the time. Mears and Stainbank of the Whitechapel Bell Foundry cast the treble bell in 1873. The church also has a Sanctus bell that James Wells of Aldbourne, Wiltshire cast in 1800.

=== Evangelical Free Church ===
Ashbury Mission Hall was a "tin tabernacle" building of corrugated iron opened in 1908. It was replaced in 1972–73 with the present Ashbury Evangelical Free Church. Ashbury has a house which is a former Methodist chapel in Chapel Lane.

== Amenities ==
Ashbury has a public house, the Rose and Crown Hotel, a 16th-century coaching inn controlled by Arkell's Brewery. The Church of England primary school in Ashbury serves Ashbury and Compton Beauchamp. The present school was built in the latter part of the 20th century. The previous school building is now the village hall. Ashbury has a cricket club. It also has a village shop with a cafe and a children's play area.

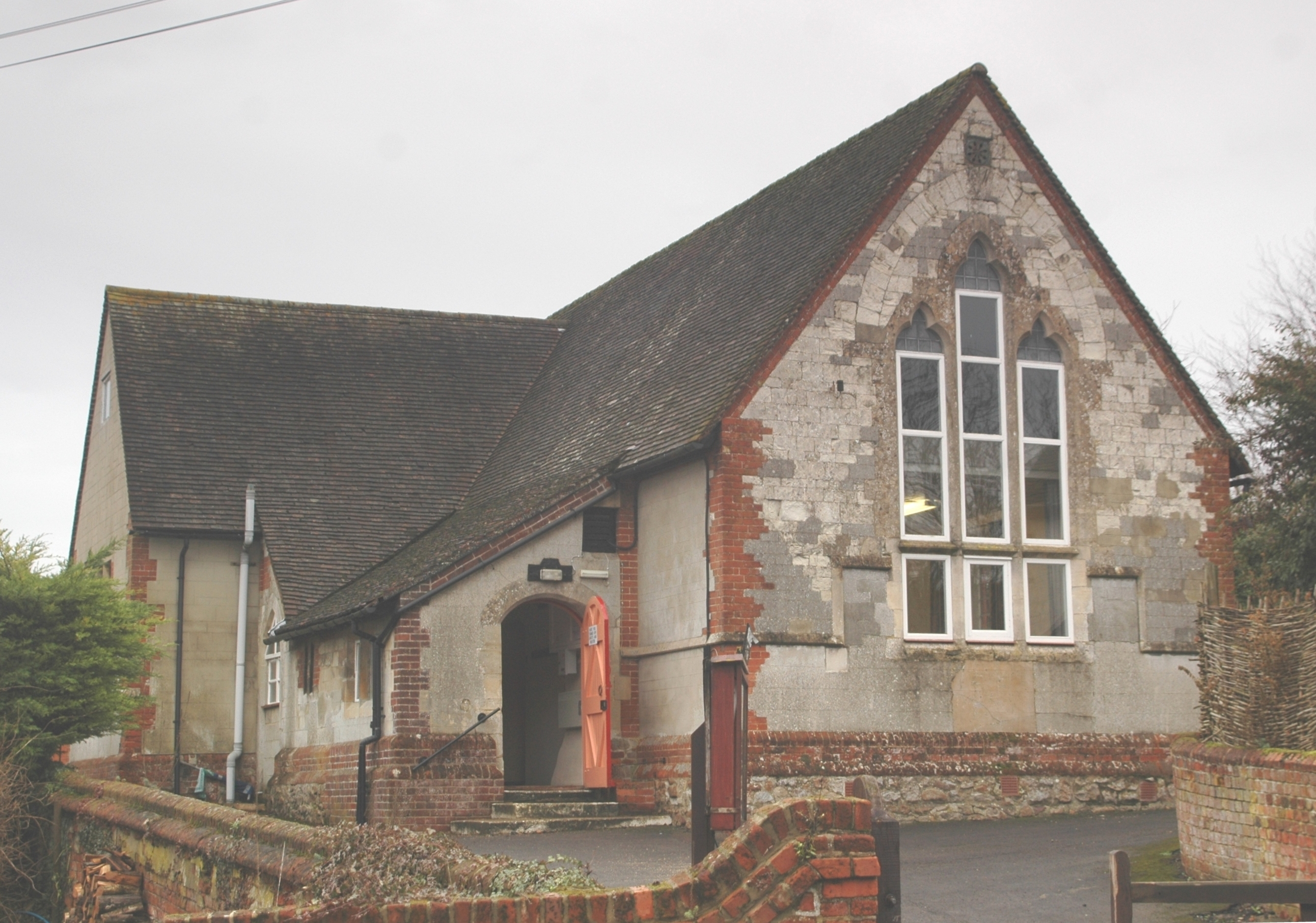
Former parish school, today a Village Hall

== Sources ==
- Page, W.H.; Ditchfield, P.H., eds. (1924). A History of the County of Berkshire. Victoria County History. Vol. 4. assisted by John Hautenville Cope. London: The St Katherine Press. pp. 503–512.
- Pevsner, Nikolaus (1966). Berkshire. The Buildings of England. Harmondsworth: Penguin Books. pp. 70–72.
- Rackham, Oliver (1976). Trees and Woodland in the British Landscape. Archaeology in the Field Series. London: J.M. Dent & Sons Ltd. p. 144. ISBN 0-460-04183-5.
