= George Ayliffe Poole =

English cleric and author

George Ayliffe Poole (1809–1883) was an English Anglican cleric and a writer on religion, church architecture and history. He strongly advocated the Gothic Revival.

== Life ==
Poole was a scholar of Emmanuel College, Cambridge, who graduated B.A. in 1831 and proceeded M.A. in 1838. He took holy orders in 1832, and was curate successively of Twickenham, of the Church of St John the Evangelist, Edinburgh, and of St Chad's Church, Shrewsbury. On 16 March 1839 he was appointed perpetual curate of St James's, Leeds.

In 1843 Poole was presented to the vicarage of Welford, Northamptonshire. which he held until, in 1876, he was presented by William Connor Magee, Bishop of Peterborough, to the rectory of Winwick in the same county. He acted for some years as rural dean of the district.

Poole was a strong high churchman. He died at Winwick on 25 September 1883, having married a daughter of Jonathan Wilks of St Ann's, Burley.

== Works ==
Poole, with John Henry Parker and Matthew Holbeche Bloxam, was a leading advocate of the Gothic Revival. His works, with sermons and tracts, were these:

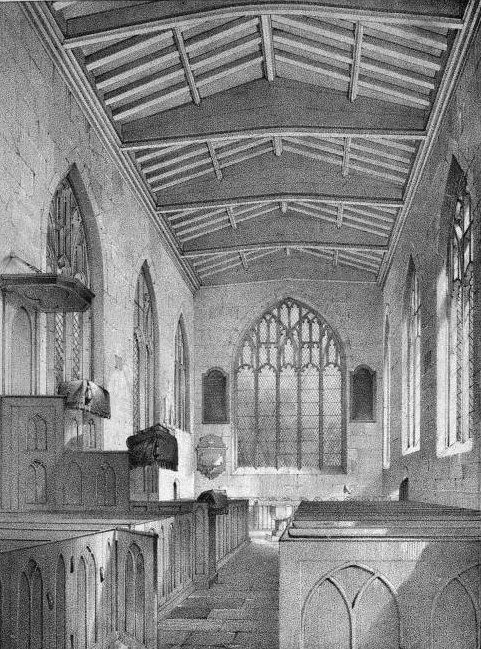
Illustration of Skirlaugh Chapel, from Architectural, historical, and picturesque Illustrations of the Chapel of St. Augustine, Skirlaugh, Yorkshire (1855), edited by George Ayliffe Poole

- The Exile's Return; or a Cat's Journey from Glasgow to Edinburgh, a tale for children, Edinburgh, 1837
- The Testimony of St. Cyprian against Rome, London, 1838
- The Anglo-Catholic Use of Two Lights upon the Altar, for the signification that Christ is the very true Light of the World, stated and defended, London, 1840
- The Life and Times of St. Cyprian, Oxford, 1840
- On the present State of Parties in the Church of England, with especial reference to the alleged tendencies of the Oxford School to the Doctrines and Communion of Rome, London, 1841
- The Appropriate Character of Church Architecture, Leeds, 1842; reissued in 1845 as ‘Churches: their Structure, Arrangement, and Decoration,’ London
- Churches of Yorkshire, described and edited (with others), 1842
- A History of the Church in America (part of vol. ii. of The Christian's Miscellany), Leeds, 1842
- A History of England, from the First Invasion by the Romans to the Accession of Queen Victoria, London, 1844–1845, 2 vols
- The Churches of Scarborough, Filey, and the Neighbourhood, London, 1848 (with John West Hugall)
- A History of Ecclesiastical Architecture in England, London, 1848
- Sir Raoul de Broc and his Son Tristram, a tale of the twelfth century, London, 1849
- An historical and descriptive Guide to York Cathedral (with Hugall), York, 1850
- Architectural, historical, and picturesque Illustrations of the Chapel of St. Augustine, Skirlaugh, Yorkshire (edited by Poole), Hull, 1855
- Diocesan History of Peterborough, London

== Notes ==
Attribution

- This article incorporates text from a publication now in the public domain: Lee, Sidney, ed. (1896). "Poole, George Ayliffe". Dictionary of National Biography. Vol. 46. London: Smith, Elder & Co.
