= Rinodina atrocinerea =

Scientific classification
- Domain: Eukaryota
- Kingdom: Fungi
- Division: Ascomycota
- Class: Lecanoromycetes
- Order: Caliciales
- Family: Physciaceae
- Genus: Rinodina
- Species: R. atrocinerea

Binomial name
- Rinodina atrocinerea (Sm. ex Hook.) Körb.

Synonyms
- Lecidea atrocinerea Hook. (1833)

Species of lichen

Rinodina atrocinerea is a species of lichen belonging to the family Physciaceae.

It is native to Europe and Northern America.
