= Ablington, Wiltshire =

Village in Wiltshire, England

Coordinates: 51.222°N 1.773°W

Ablington
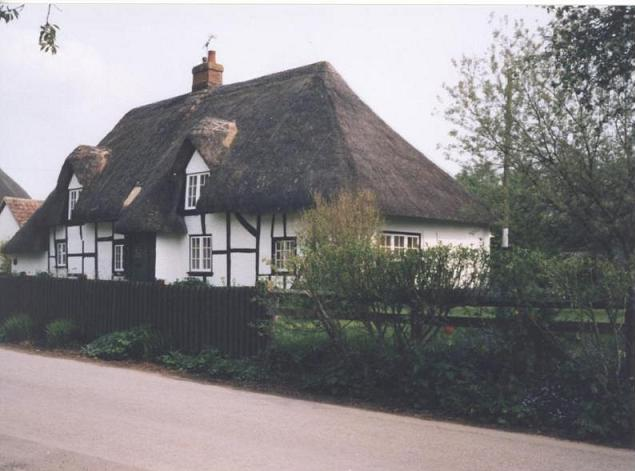

- Location within Wiltshire
- OS grid reference: SU159479
- Civil parish: Figheldean
- Unitary authority: Wiltshire
- Ceremonial county: Wiltshire
- Region: South West
- Country: England
- Sovereign state: United Kingdom
- Post town: Salisbury
- Postcode district: SP4
- Dialling code: 01980
- Police: Wiltshire
- Fire: Dorset and Wiltshire
- Ambulance: South Western
- UK Parliament: East Wiltshire

Ablington is a small village in the English county of Wiltshire, on the River Avon, close to the village of Figheldean and about 3.5 miles (5.6 km) north of the town of Amesbury.

Barrow Clump, a prehistoric site re-used as a burial ground for an Anglo-Saxon village, is some 700 metres east of Ablington.

The settlement was recorded as Alboldintone in the Domesday Book. Ablington farmhouse is an 18th-century thatched building, extended in c. 1880 and at later dates.

For local government purposes, Ablington is part of Figheldean civil parish.
