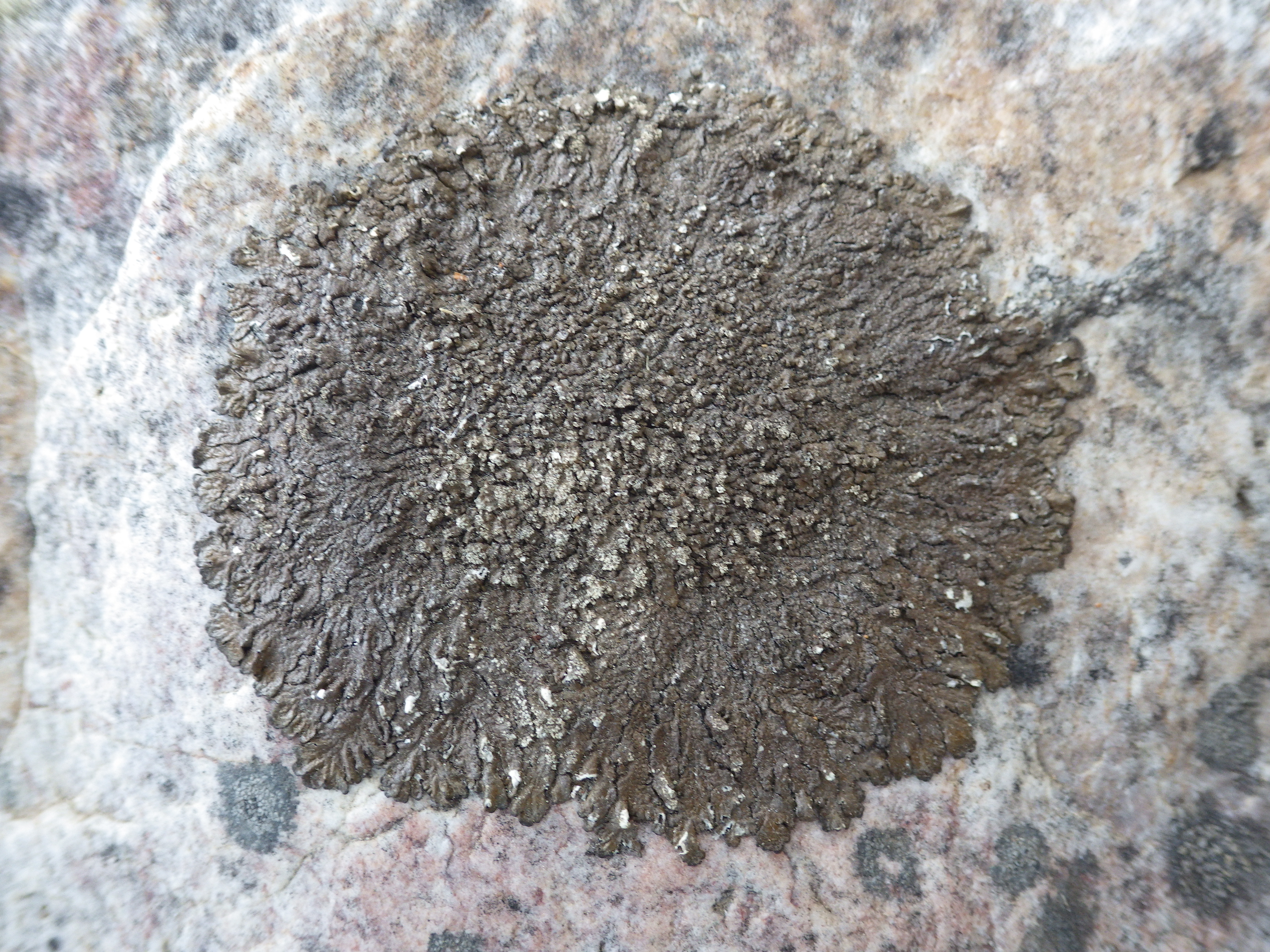
- Growing on siliceous rock, Serra de São Mamede, Portugal

Conservation status
- Apparently Secure (NatureServe)

Scientific classification
- Kingdom: Fungi
- Division: Ascomycota
- Class: Lecanoromycetes
- Order: Lecanorales
- Family: Parmeliaceae
- Genus: Xanthoparmelia
- Species: X. loxodes

Binomial name
- Xanthoparmelia loxodes (Nyl.) O.Blanco, A.Crespo, Elix, D.Hawksw. & Lumbsch (2004)

Synonyms
- Parmelia loxodes Nyl. (1872); Neofuscelia loxodes (Nyl.) Essl. (1978)

= Xanthoparmelia loxodes =

Species of lichen

Xanthoparmelia loxodes is a species of foliose lichen in the family Parmeliaceae. It was first formally described by Finnish botanist William Nylander in 1872, as Parmelia loxodes. In 1978, Ted Esslinger created the genus Neofuscelia, which contained species previously classified in Parmelia subgenus Neofusca; Neofuscelia loxodes was one of many species transferred here. In a molecular phylogenetic study published by Oscar Blanco in 2004, Ana Crespo, John A. Elix, David L. Hawksworth and H. Thorsten Lumbsch, they showed that Neofuscelia did not form a clade distinct from Xanthoparmelia, and they reduced it to synonymy under Xanthoparmelia.

Xanthoparmelia loxodes is widely distributed in Europe, where it grows on siliceous rocks.

== See also ==
- List of Xanthoparmelia species
