= Compton Beauchamp =

Hamlet in Oxfordshire, England

Coordinates: 51.585°N 1.599°W

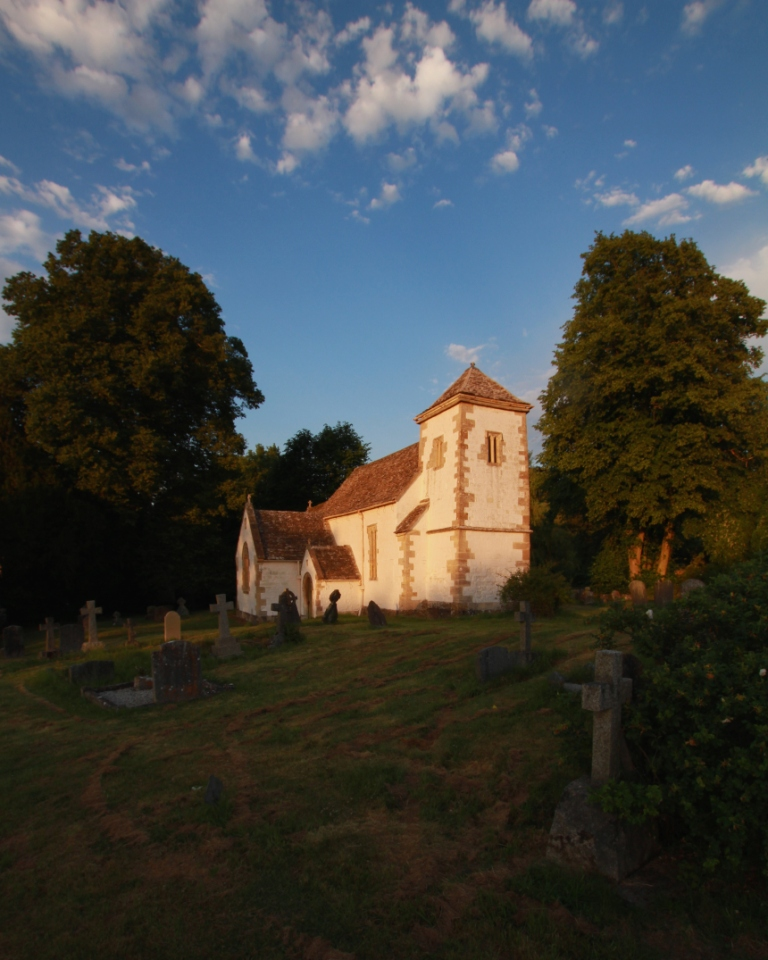
- St Swithun's parish church

- Location within Oxfordshire
- Population: 50 (2001 Census)
- OS grid reference: SU2887
- Civil parish: Compton Beauchamp
- District: Vale of White Horse
- Shire county: Oxfordshire
- Region: South East
- Country: England
- Sovereign state: United Kingdom
- Post town: Swindon
- Postcode district: SN6
- Dialling code: 01367
- Police: Thames Valley
- Fire: Oxfordshire
- Ambulance: South Central
- UK Parliament: Witney

Compton Beauchamp is a hamlet and civil parish 3 miles (5 km) southeast of Shrivenham in the Vale of White Horse, England. It was part of Berkshire until the 1974 boundary changes transferred it to Oxfordshire. The 2001 Census recorded the parish's population as 50.

== Location ==
The village is at the foot of the Berkshire Downs. The parish includes the hamlet of Knighton and the former hamlet of Hardwell. Nearby is the Iron Age hill fort of Hardwell Castle.

== History ==
Compton's toponym is derived from the Old English cum meaning "valley" and tun meaning "farm" or "settlement". Its manor was held by the Beauchamp family in the 13th century. The moated Compton Beauchamp House was the home of the King's Councillor, Sir Thomas Fettiplace, from about 1507. His only daughter, Elizabeth, the wife of Sir Francis Englefield, had no children and the property passed to her Fettiplace cousins who took little interest in the property. In 1589 it was sold to an in-law, Sir Henry Poole. The old house had deteriorated and Poole appears to have pulled it down and replaced it with the present house in about 1600. Early in the 18th century a Palladian facade was attached to the eastern entrance front of this small Tudor manor house. The house was rented later in the 19th century by the jurist James Bacon and in 1940 by the Singer Manufacturing Company heiress Daisy Fellowes.

== Parish church ==
The Church of England parish church of Saint Swithun is 13th century and is built of chalk. The east window is a Decorated Gothic insertion and the north transept east window is early 14th century. The font is a Perpendicular Gothic addition. The mural on the chancel walls was painted by members of James Bacon's family, principally Lydia Lawrence. The reredos, rood and altar rail were made by the artist Martin Travers in the 1930s under the patronage of the banking heir and publisher, Samuel Gurney, who lived at the time in the Old Rectory.

== Sources ==
- Ford, David Nash (2002). "Compton Beauchamp House". Royal Berkshire History.
- Page, W.H.; Ditchfield, P.H., eds. (1924). A History of the County of Berkshire. Victoria County History. Vol. 4. assisted by John Hautenville Cope. London: The St Katherine Press. pp. 523–528.
- Pevsner, Nikolaus (1966). Berkshire. The Buildings of England. Harmondsworth: Penguin Books. p. 121.
