= Peter Ditchfield =

British priest, historian and author

Peter Hampson Ditchfield
- Born: Peter Hampson Ditchfield; 20 April 1854; Westhoughton, Lancashire
- Died: 16 September 1930 (aged 76); Barkham, Berkshire
- Resting place: Barkham
- Education: Royal Grammar School, Clitheroe; Oriel College, Oxford
- Occupations: Priest, historian, editor
- Known for: English local history

Rev. Peter Hampson Ditchfield, FSA (20 April 1854 – 16 September 1930) was a Church of England priest, historian and prolific author. He is notable for having co-edited three Berkshire volumes of the Victoria County History which were published between 1907 and 1924.

== Life ==
Peter Ditchfield was born in Westhoughton, Lancashire in 1854. He was schooled at the Clitheroe Royal Grammar School and studied at Oriel College, Oxford. He was ordained deacon in 1878 and priest in 1879. He served as curate of St Michael's parish church, Sandhurst until 1880, followed by a second curacy at Christ Church, Reading, Berkshire.

He was appointed Rector of Barkham in 1886: a post that he held until his death. From 1886 until 1903 he was Inspector of Schools for the Diocese of Oxford.

He was an historian and a prolific author. He also co-edited with William Page three Berkshire volumes of the Victoria County History, which were published in 1907, 1923 and 1924.

Ditchfield was concerned about the urban development of historic towns and published Vanishing England in 1919.

He served as Secretary of the Berkshire Archaeological Society for 38 years until 1929, when he became its president. He edited the Berks, Bucks and Oxon Archaeological Journal from 1897 until his death.

Ditchfield was a Freemason. He was Grand Chaplain of the Freemasons of England in 1917 and of the Mark Masons in 1918.

== Personal life ==
In 1898 Ditchfield married the daughter of Charles Smith of Ravenswood, Berkshire.

== Selected works ==
- Our English Villages Their Story and Antiquities. London: Methuen & Co. 1889.
- Old English Sports, Pastimes and Customs. London: Methuen & Co. 1891.
- The Tourist's Guide to Berkshire; with some preliminary remarks as to its early History, Antiquities, Worthies, etc. London: Edward Stanford. 1892.
- The Church in the Netherlands. London: Wells Gardner, Darton & Co. 1892.
- Books Fatal to their Authors. London: Elliot Stock. 1895.
- Old English Customs Extant at the Present Time; an Account of Lord Observances, Festival Customs and Ancient Ceremonies Yet Surviving in Great Britain. London: George Redway. 1896.
- Bygone Berkshire. London: William Andrews & Co. 1896.
- The Story of our English Towns. London: George Redway. 1897.
- Memorials of Old Buckinghamshire. London: Bemrose & Sons. 1901.
- English Villages. London: Methuen & Co. 1901.
- An Illustrated Guide to the Cathedrals of Great Britain. London: J.M. Dent & Co. 1902.
- Memorials of Old Oxfordshire. Bemrose & Sons Ltd. 1903.
- English Gothic Architecture. London: J.M. Dent & Co. 1904.
- City Companies of London and Their Good Works: a Record of Their History, Charity and Treasure. London: J.M. Dent & Co. 1904.
- Picturesque English Cottages and their Doorway Gardens. Philadelphia: J. C. Winston Co. 1905.
- Faithful Jess. A Village Story. London: Robert Scott. 1907.
- Memorials of Old Kent. London: Bemrose & Sons. 1907. co-authored with George Clinch
- The Parish Clerk. London: Methuen & Co. 1907.
- Page, William; Ditchfield, P.H., eds. (1907). Victoria County History: A History of the County of Berkshire, Volume 2. London: Archibald Constable & Co.
- The Old-Time Parson. London: Methuen & Co. 1908.
- Memorials of Old London. Vol. I. London: Bemrose & Sons Ltd. 1908.
- Memorials of Old London. Vol. II. London: Bemrose & Sons Ltd. 1908.
- The Charm of the English Village. London: B.T. Batsford. 1908.
- Memorials of Old Lancashire. Vol. I. London: Bemrose & Sons Ltd. 1909.
- Memorials of Old Lancashire. Vol. II. London: Bemrose & Sons Ltd. 1909.
- The Parson's Pleasance. Mills & Boon. 1910.
- The Manor Houses of England. London: B.T. Batsford. 1910.
- Vanishing England. London: Methuen & Co. 1910.
- Memorials of Old Cheshire. London: George Allen & Sons. 1910. edited with the Ven. Edward Barber
- The Arts of the Church: Symbolism of the Saints. London: A. R. Mowbray & Co. 1910.
- Memorials of Old Gloucestershire. London: George Allen & Co. 1911.
- Out of the Ivory Palaces. Mills & Boon. 1911.
- The Counties of England. Vol. I. London: George Allen & Co. 1912.
- The Counties of England. Vol. II. London: George Allen & Co. 1912.
- The Old English Country Squire. London: Methuen & Co. 1912.
- The Cottages and the Village Life of Rural England. London: J.M. Dent & Co. 1912.
- Oxfordshire. Cambridge County Geographies. Cambridge: Cambridge University Press. 1912.
- London Survivals. A Record of the Old Buildings and Associations of the City. London: Methuen & Co. 1914.
- The Village Church. London: Methuen & Co. 1914.
- The England of Shakespeare. London: Methuen & Co. 1917.
- Old Village Life Or, Glimpses of Village Life Through All Ages. London: Methuen & Co. 1920.
- Byways in Berkshire and the Cotswolds. London: Robert Scott. 1920.
- The City of London. The Story of the English Towns. London: SPCK. 1921.
- Country Folk a Pleasant Company. London: Methuen & Co. 1923.
- Page, William; Ditchfield, P.H., eds. (1923). Victoria County History: A History of the County of Berkshire, Volume 3.
- Page, William; Ditchfield, P.H., eds. (1924). Victoria County History: A History of the County of Berkshire, Volume 4.
- London's West End. London: Jonathan Cape. 1925.
