= Longma =

Winged horse in Chinese mythology

- A dragon horse
- Traditional Chinese: 龍馬
- Simplified Chinese: 龙马
- Literal meaning: dragon horse
Transcriptions
Standard Mandarin
- Hanyu Pinyin: lóngmǎ
- Wade–Giles: lung^{2}-ma^{3}

The longma is a fabled winged horse with dragon scales in Chinese mythology. Seeing a longma was an omen of a legendary sage-ruler, particularly one of the Three Sovereigns and Five Emperors.

== Name ==
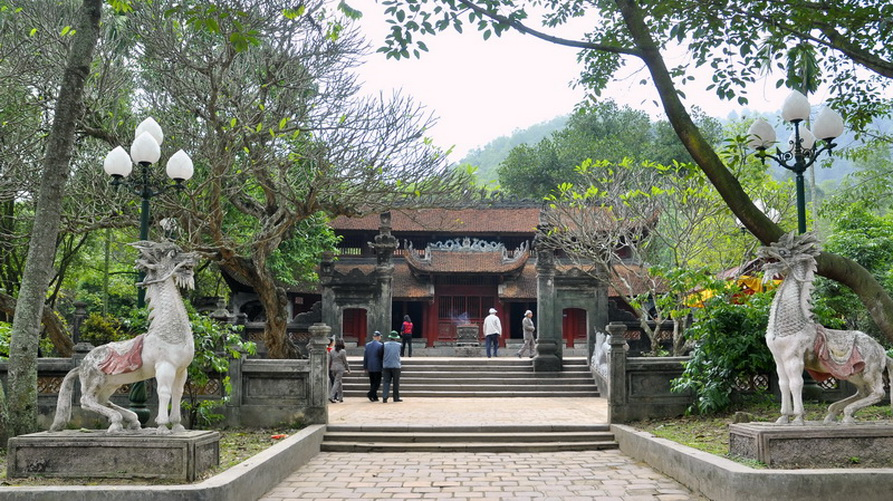
Pair of Longma statues at Sóc Temple, Sóc Sơn, Vietnam

Ryūma shōgi piece.

The Chinese word longma combines long (龍; "dragon") and ma (馬). Compare hema (河馬; 'river horse'; "hippopotamus") and haima (海馬; 'sea horse'; "seahorse"). In addition to naming the mythic creature, longma (龍馬; "dragon horse") can refer to an eminent person, such as in the four-character idiom 龍馬精神; longma jingshen; "vigorous spirit in old age".

Longma interconnects traditional Chinese beliefs about dragons and horses. An early example comes from the Zhouli (周禮; 'Rites of Zhou'), which differentiates names for horses of different heights, measured in the chi (尺; 'Chinese foot') (historically around 23–33 centimeters, see Chinese units of measurement). Horses up to 8 feet tall are called long (龍; "dragon"), those up to 7 feet are called lai (騋), and those up to 6 feet are called ma (馬; 'horse'). The Han dynasty scholar Wang Chong says, "The people paint the dragon's shape with a horse's head and a snake's tail (世俗畫龍之象，馬頭蛇尾。)."

Edward H. Schafer describes the horse's "tremendous importance" to Tang dynasty rulers for military tactics, diplomatic policy, and aristocratic privilege.

Still, this patrician animal owed his unique status to more than his usefulness to the lords of the land. He was invested with sanctity by ancient tradition, endowed with prodigious qualities, and visibly stamped with the marks of his divine origin. A revered myth proclaimed him a relative of the dragon, akin to the mysterious powers of water. Indeed, all wonderful horses, such as the steed of the pious Hsüan-tsang which, in later legend, carried the sacred scriptures from India, were avatars of dragons, and in antiquity the tallest horse owned by the Chinese were called simply "dragons".

This "steed" refers to Tang Sanzang's famous bailongma (白龍馬; "white dragon horse").

The Japanese loanword ryūma or ryōma 龍馬 (simplified 竜馬) has several meanings. Ryūma refers to the legendary Chinese "dragon horse" and the name of a chess piece in shogi (translated "promoted bishop", also pronounced ryūme). Ryōma is commonly used as a Japanese name, for instance Sakamoto Ryōma. See Visser for details about the dragon-horse in Japan.

== Classical references ==
Many Chinese classic texts refer to the longma "dragon horse".

The most famous longma occurrences are connected with the mythical Hetu (河圖; "Yellow River chart"), which along with the Luoshu (洛書; "Luo River writing; Lo Shu Square") are ancient magic square arrangements of the Bagua "8 Trigrams" and Wuxing "5 Phases". They are traditionally linked with prehistoric Chinese rulers, a longma revealed the Hetu to Fu Xi or Shun, and the shell of a gui (龜; "tortoise") revealed the Luoshu to Yu. "The Great Treatise" commentary to the Yijing explains.

Heaven creates divine things; the holy sage takes them as models. Heaven and earth change and transform; the holy sage imitates them. In the heavens hang images that reveal good fortune and misfortune; the holy sage reproduces these. The Yellow River brought forth a map and the Lo River brought forth a writing; the holy men took these as models.

"The water of the Ho sent forth a dragon horse; on its back there was curly hair, like a map of starry dots", says the Yijing commentary, "The water of the Lo sent forth a divine tortoise; on its back there were riven veins, like writing of character pictures." Hetu (河圖) is alternately named longtu (龍圖) and matu (馬圖), with "dragon" and "horse". For instance, the Baihutong 白虎通 (封禪) says "the Yellow River sent forth the dragon chart" (河出龍圖) while the Liji (禮運) says "the Yellow River sent forth the horse chart" (河出馬圖).

The Shujing (顧命)) records the original Hetu "river plan" among the royal treasures of King Cheng of Zhou (r. c. 1042–1021 BCE). Kong Anguo's Shujing commentary explains the longma.

A dragon horse is the [qi (氣)] vital spirit of Heaven and Earth. As a being its shape consists of a horse's body, yet it has dragon scales. Therefore it is called 'dragon horse'. Its height is eight ch'ih five ts'un. A true dragon horse has wings at its sides and walks upon the water without sinking. If a holy man is on the throne it comes out of the midst of the Ming river, carrying a map on its back.

The Bamboo Annals which record ancient Chinese mythology and history describe the longma in a context of Yao conveying the throne to Shun. The spirits of the five planets appeared on the Yellow River and predicted, "The river scheme will come and tell the emperor of the time. He who knows us is the double-pupilled yellow Yaou." (Yao supposedly had double-pupil eyes, indicating insight). The Yellow River gave off light, beautiful vapors, and clouds.

Then a dragon-horse appeared, bearing in his mouth a scaly cuirass, with red lines on a green ground, ascended the altar, laid down the scheme, and went away. The cuirass was like a tortoise shell, nine cubits broad. The scheme contained a tally of white gem, in a casket of red gem, covered with yellow gold, and bound with a green string. On the tally were the words, 'With pleased countenance given to the emperor Shun'.

A subsequent Bamboo Annals context describes the spirit of the Yellow River as a person rather than a dragon-horse, and says Yao rather than Yu received the Hetu in order to control the Great Flood.

As he was looking at the Ho [Yellow River], a tall man, with a white face and fish's body, came out and said, 'I am the spirit of the Ho.' He then called Yu, and said, 'Wan-ming [Yu] shall regulate the waters.' Having so spoken, he gave Yu a chart of the Ho, containing all about the regulating of the waters; and returned into the deep.

The 4th-century Shiyiji (拾遺記) records that Emperor Mu of Jin, "drove around the world in a carriage, drawn by eight winged dragon horses." This context uses the modified expression long zhi jun (龍之駿; "dragon's excellent-horse").

The 10th-century Taiping Imperial Reader says a longma that appeared in 741 was considered as a good omen for Emperor Xuanzong of Tang.

It was spotted blue and red, and covered with scales. Its mane resembled that of a dragon, and its neighing was like the tone of a flute. It could cover three hundred miles. Its mother was a common horse which had become pregnant by drinking water from a river in which it was bathed.

== Comparative mythology ==
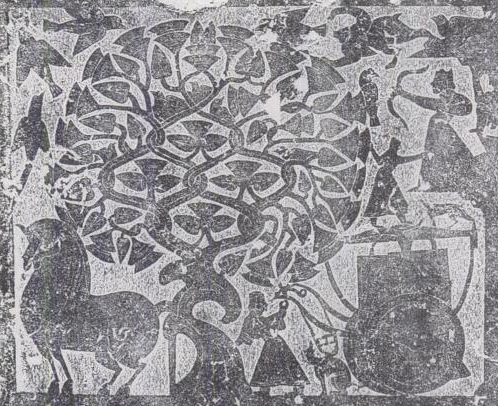
A longma (lower left corner) on a rubbing from the Wu Liang shrines' reliefs

Longma or "dragon horse" connects with other creatures in Chinese folklore. While longma sometimes applies to the Qilin, the closest relative is the legendary tianma (天馬) "heavenly horse" or the "Chinese Pegasus", which was metaphorically identified with the hanxuema (汗血馬; "blood-sweating horse") or Ferghana horse. A poem attributed to Emperor Wu of Han celebrates a 101 BCE victory over Western tribes.

The Heavenly Horses are coming, Coming from the Far West. They crossed the Flowing Sands, For the barbarians are conquered. … The Heavenly Horses are coming; Jupiter is in the Dragon. Should they choose to soar aloft, Who could keep pace with them? They will draw me up and carry me To the Holy Mountain of K'un-lun. The Heavenly Horses have come And the Dragon will follow in their wake. I shall reach the of Heaven, I shall see the Palace of God.

In Chinese astrology, the Dragon and Horse are two of the twelve animals. A Zhuangzi (列禦寇) story mentions finding a "pearl worth a thousand pieces of gold" under the chin of a lilong (驪龍; "black-horse dragon").

Some mythic elements of the longma "dragon horse" are culturally widespread. Schafer elucidates:

The legend of water-born horses was known in various parts of Turkestan. In Kucha, for instance, when that city was visited by Hsüan-tsang in the seventh century, there was a lake of dragons in front of one of its temples. "The dragons, changing their form, couple with mares. The offspring is a wild species of horse (dragon-horse) difficult to tame and of a fierce nature. The breed of these dragon-horses became docile." This story must have had its origin farther west in Iranian lands, where winged horses were familiar in art and myth. Even the long-legged small-bellied horses of the "Tajik," that is, of the Arabs, were said to have been born of the conjunction of dragons with mares on the shores of the "Western Sea.".

The Chinese longma "dragon horse" is not culture-specific. Mythological hybrid animals or chimeras are known worldwide, including combinations of dragons and horses. In Greek mythology, the Hippocamp or Hippocampus (lit. "horse sea-monster"), which supposedly has the head and front legs of a horse and the hindquarters of a dragon or fish, parallels the longma. In Babylonian mythology, "dragon-horse" is a title of the goddess Tiamat. Among the prehistoric hill figures in Oxfordshire, Dragon Hill is below the Uffington White Horse.

== See also ==
- Bai Longma
- Qianlima
- Horse in Chinese mythology
- Horses in Chinese culture
- Qilin
- Tianma
