= Uffington White Horse =

Prehistoric carving in Uffington, England

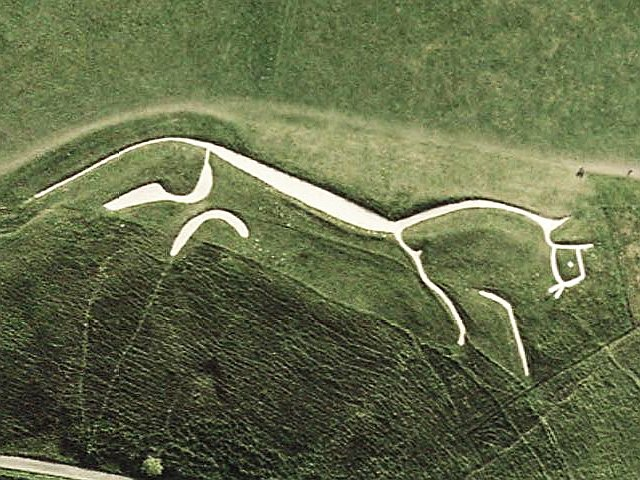
- Aerial view of the White Horse

- Location in Oxfordshire
- 51°34′39″N 1°34′00″W
- Type: Hill figure monument
- Location: Whitehorse Hill, Oxfordshire, England

History
- Built: 1380–550 BC

Site notes
- Material: Chalk
- Elevation: 261 m (856 ft)
- Length: 100 m (330 ft)
- Owner: National Trust
- Public access: Yes
- Website: nationaltrust.org.uk/white-horse-hill

Scheduled monument
- Designated: 1929
- Reference no.: 1008412

The Uffington White Horse is a prehistoric hill figure, 110 m (360 ft) long, formed from deep trenches filled with crushed white chalk. The figure is situated on the upper slopes of Whitehorse Hill in the English civil parish of Uffington in Oxfordshire, some 16 km (10 mi) east of Swindon, 8 km (5.0 mi) south of the town of Faringdon and a similar distance west of the town of Wantage; or 2.5 km (1.6 mi) south of Uffington. The hill forms a part of the scarp of the Berkshire Downs and overlooks the Vale of White Horse to the north. The best views of the figure are obtained from the air, or from directly across the Vale, particularly around the villages of Great Coxwell, Longcot, and Fernham.

The Uffington White Horse was created some time between 1380 and 550 BC, during the late Bronze Age or early Iron Age. The site is owned and managed by the National Trust and is a scheduled monument. The Guardian stated in 2003 that "for more than 3,000 years, the Uffington White Horse has been jealously guarded as a masterpiece of minimalist art." The Uffington Horse is by far the oldest of the white horse figures in Britain; the others inspired by it have an entirely different design.

== Origin ==
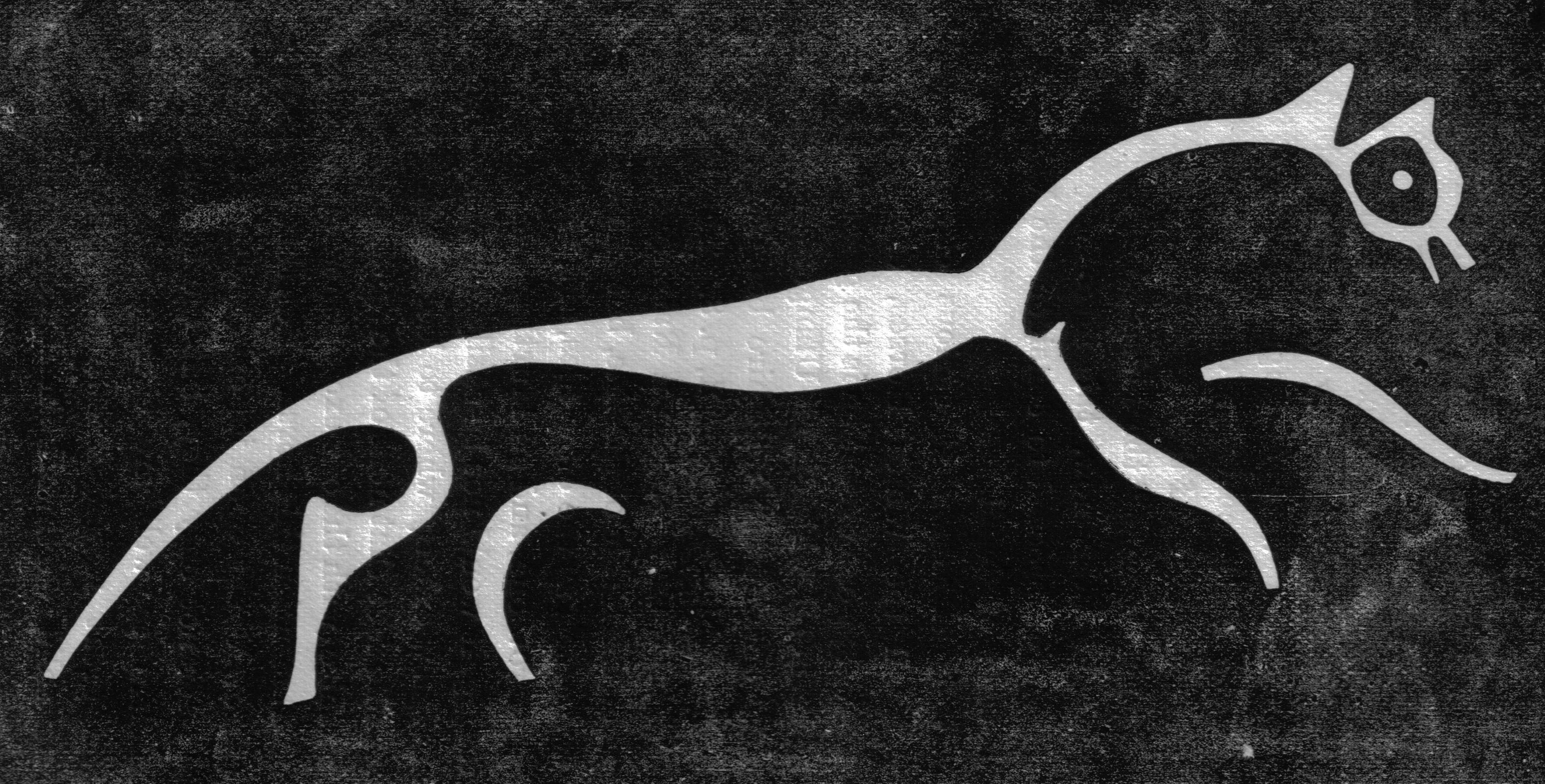
Uffington White Horse, sketched by William Plenderleath in The White Horses of the West of England (1892)

The earliest reference to the site is found in Medieval Welsh literature. The Llyfr Coch Hergest (Red Book of Hergest, 1375–1425) states that "Near to the town of Abinton there is a mountain with a figure of a stallion upon it, and it is white. Nothing grows upon it." Some scholars have compared the figure to the Celtic goddess Epona, or the later Rhiannon of the Mabinogi.

The figure is one of a number in the area that was long thought to have ancient origins. In the 17th century, John Aubrey attributed the figure to Hengist and Horsa. However, Aubrey also ascribed its origins to the British Celts, noting the similarity of the image to those found on native Iron Age coins. Francis Wise speculated that the image may have been created by Alfred the Great to celebrate his victory at the Battle of Edington.

Although the notion of it being a post-Roman creation remained popular, many antiquarians and scholars had noted the design's similarity to the Celtic art found on the coins of the local tribes (the Dobunni and Atrebates). Comparative analysis of the design with numismatic and archeological finds was conducted by Stuart Piggott in 1931 and Ann Ross in 1967, with Piggott suggesting circa 100 BC as a possible date of origin. In 1949, Morris Marple suggested a Bronze Age date, comparing the design to others throughout Europe and North Africa.

Following an excavation in 1990, the figure's origin was finally settled with optically stimulated luminescence testing. Simon Palmer and David Miles of the Oxford Archaeological Unit dated silt deposits to the period between 1380 BC and 550 BC, confirming the Uffington White Horse to be Britain's oldest chalk figure. The new Bronze Age date would place the figure's origin at the same time as Uffington Castle, during a period when the horse was transforming warfare in Britain.

== History ==
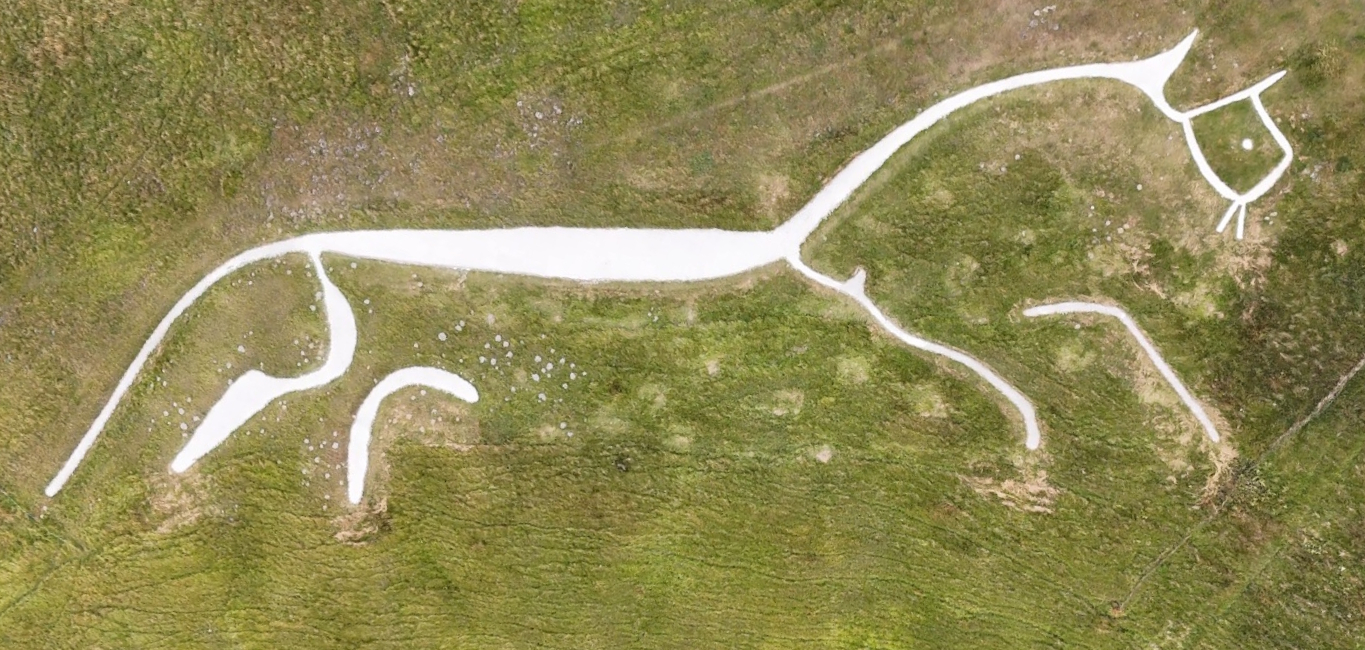
aerial view of the Uffington White Horse

Until the late 19th century, the horse was scoured every seven years as part of a more general local fair held on the hill. Francis Wise wrote in 1736: "The ceremony of scouring the Horse, from time immemorial, has been solemnized by a numerous concourse of people from all the villages roundabout." After the work was done a rural festival was held sponsored by the lord of the manor.

During the Second World War the figure, easily recognisable from the air, was covered over with turf and hedge trimmings so that Luftwaffe pilots could not use it for navigation during bombing raids. It was uncovered after the war by Welsh archaeology professor William Francis Grimes.

While the horse is annually re-chalked and restored by volunteers, there have been some alterations over the years. In August 2002, the figure was defaced with the addition of a rider and three dogs by members of the "Real Countryside Alliance" (Real CA). The act was denounced by the Countryside Alliance. For a couple of days in May 2003, a temporary hill figure advertisement for the fourth series of Channel 4's series Big Brother was controversially placed near the figure. In March 2012, as part of a pre-Cheltenham Festival publicity stunt, a bookmaker added a large jockey to the figure. In August 2023, a restoration project was planned by the National Trust and archeologist Adrian Cox to quantify and reverse the gradual shrinking of the horse since the 1980s. In the summer of 2024, Oxford Archaeology, in partnership with the National Trust and English Heritage, began the project to restore the horse to its original position and shape with the help of many volunteers.

== Representation and meaning ==
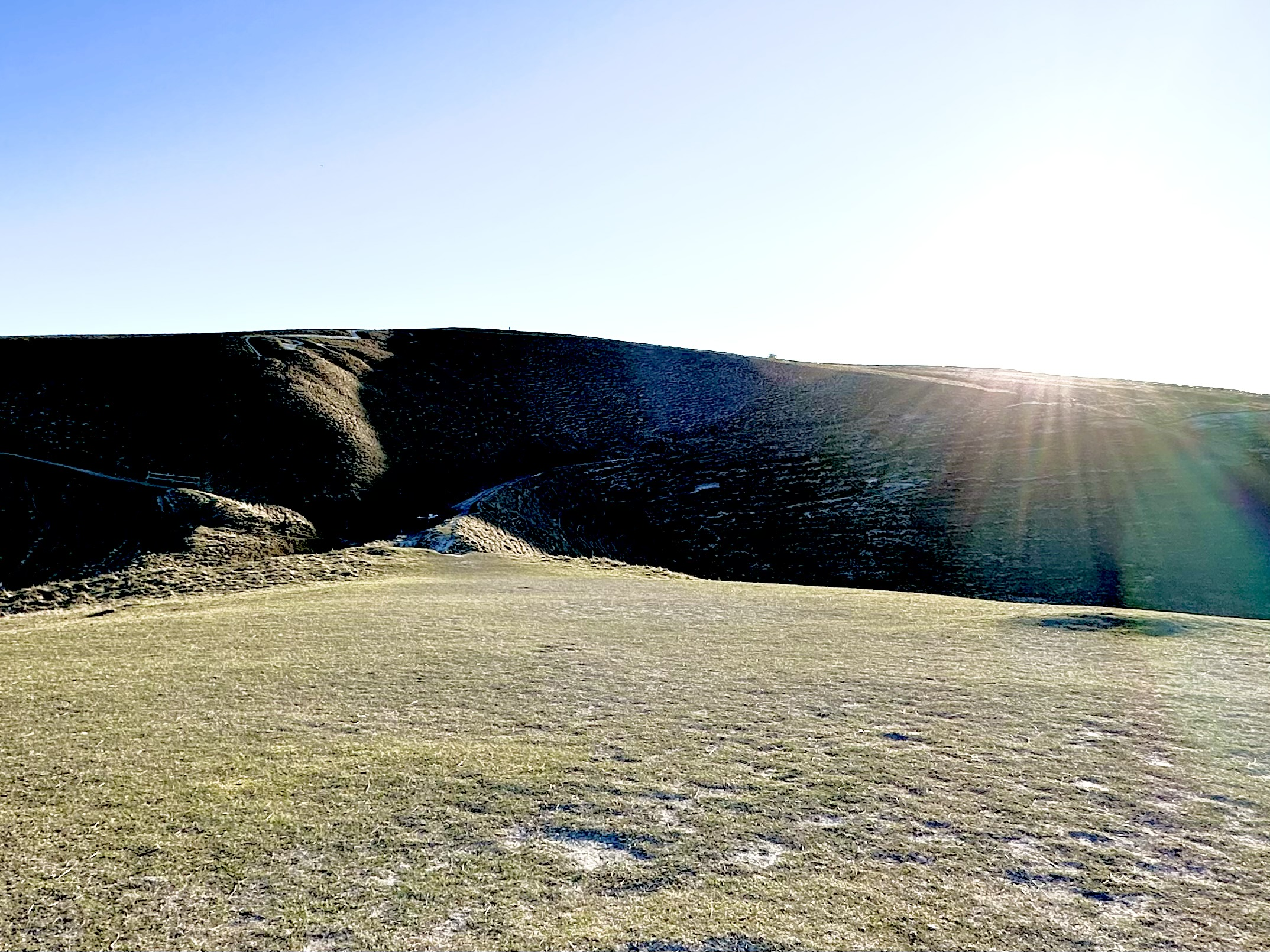
Uffington White Horse specifically illuminated by Midwinter sunlight in the early afternoon

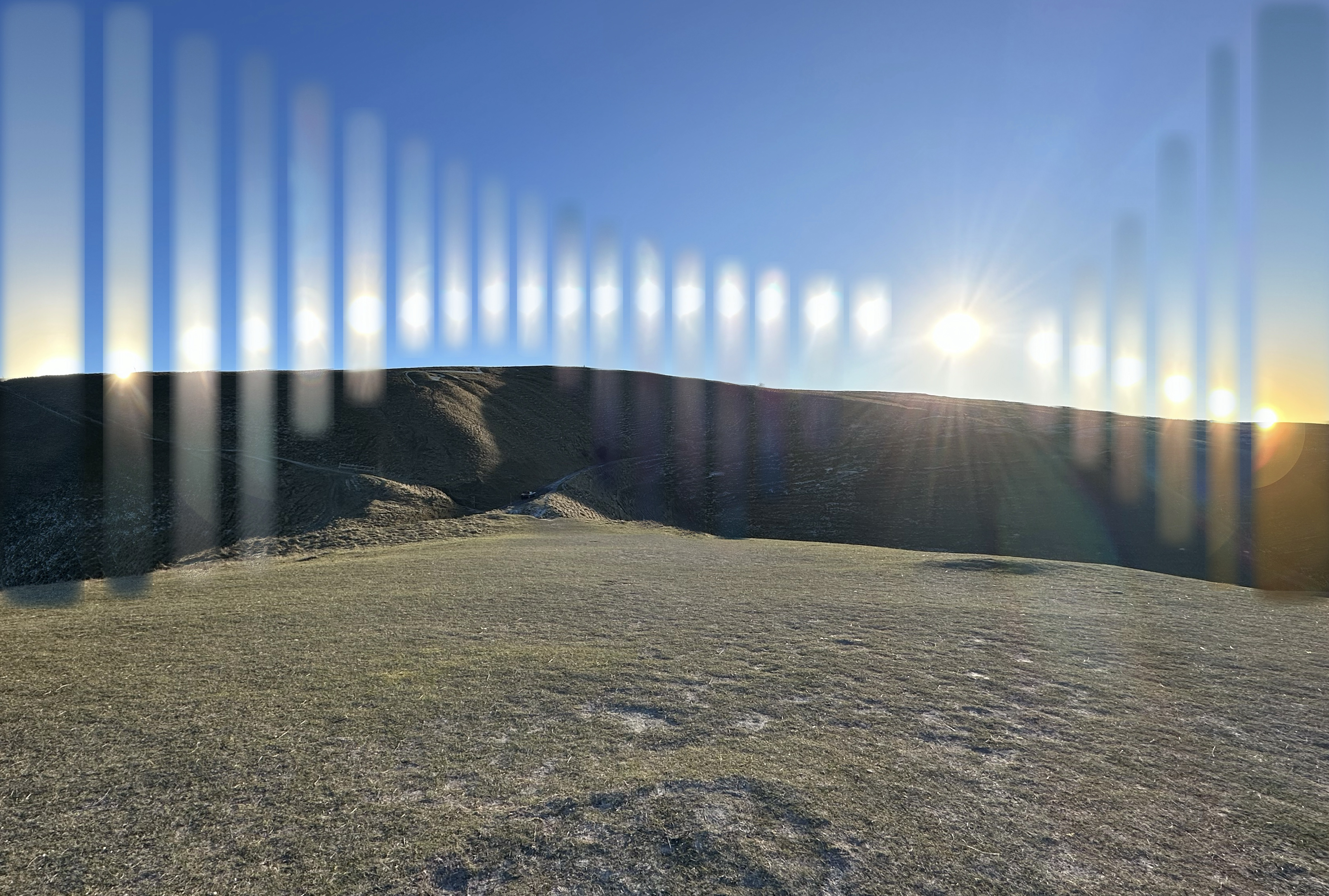
Path of midwinter Sun over White Horse Hill as seen from the summit of Dragon Hill, Uffington

It has long been debated whether the chalk figure was intended to represent a horse or some other animal, such as a dog or a sabre-toothed cat. However, it has been called a horse since the 11th century at least. A cartulary of Abingdon Abbey, compiled between 1072 and 1084, refers to "mons albi equi" at Uffington ("the White Horse Hill").

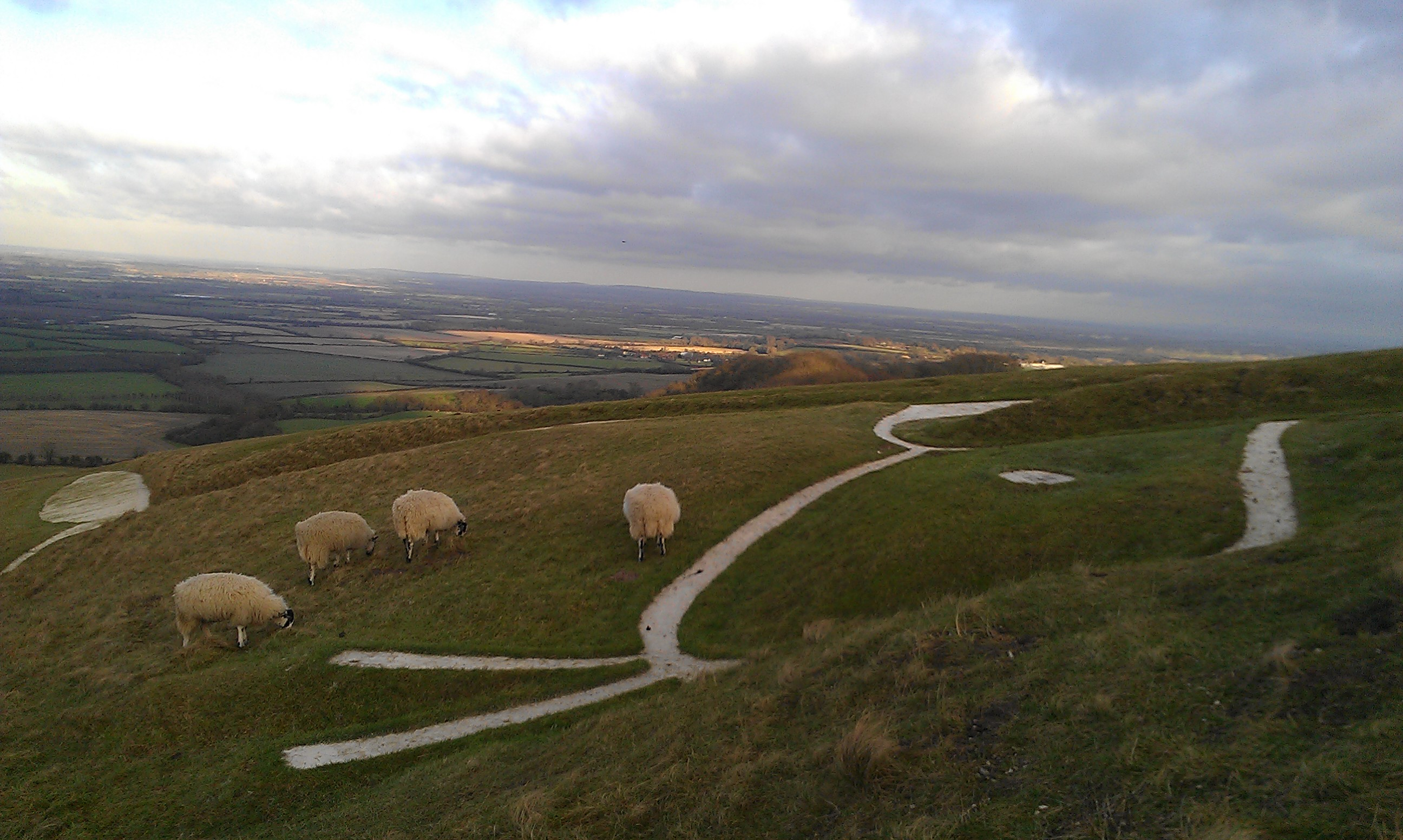
The head of the horse, with sheep grazing around it.

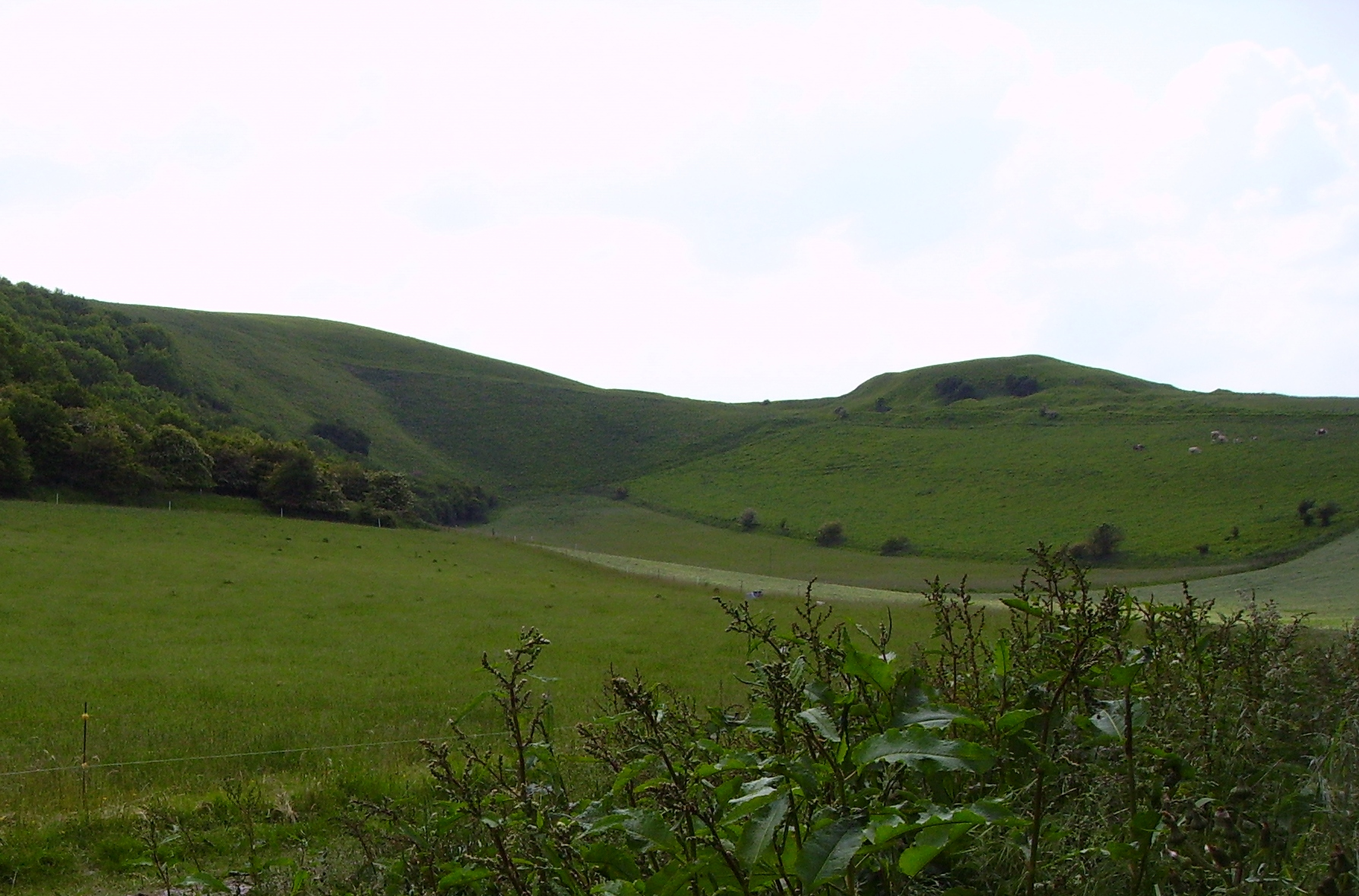
White Horse Hill (left) and Dragon Hill (right)

The horse is thought to represent a tribal symbol, perhaps connected with the builders of Uffington Castle. It is similar to horses depicted on Celtic coinage, the currency of the pre-Romano-British population, and on the Marlborough Bucket (an Iron Age burial bucket found in Marlborough, Wiltshire). (Note: ... take a closer look at the sides of the bucket in order to identify Early Iron Age depictions of horses. They have similar features to the Uffington White Horse ... In the past, this resemblance has been used to date the Uffington Horse to the Iron Age. However, it was actually created much earlier, and does not compare exactly to Iron Age representations of horses, which are often much curvier in appearance.)

Another theory proposed by University of Southampton archaeologist Joshua Pollard points to the horse's alignment with the sun, particularly in midwinter when the sun appears to overtake the horse, to indicate that it was created as a depiction of a "solar horse", reflecting mythological beliefs that the sun was carried across the sky on a horse or in a chariot.

== Scouring of the White Horse ==
The White Horse has been carefully cleared of vegetation from time to time. The figure has remained clear of turf throughout its long existence, except for being covered as a precaution during the Second World War (as it could be used as a visual landmark for navigation by enemy planes). The cleaning process, known as the Scouring of the White Horse, was formerly made the occasion of a festival. Sports of all kinds were held, and keen rivalry was maintained, not only between the inhabitants of the local villages, but between local champions and those from distant parts of England.

The first of such festivals known took place in 1755 and they lasted until 1857, when 30,000 people turned up for the event and were "too rowdy." The Scouring of the White Horse, by Tom Hughes, was published in 1859 as a semi-fictionalised recounting of his visit to the 1857 event. He recounts being told that the local towns had laid claim to a tradition of scouring the White Horse since Saxon times.

The tradition was revived in 2009 by the National Trust, with local volunteers replacing a layer of freshly quarried chalk on the Spring Bank Holiday weekend. Frequent work is required for the figure to remain visible. If regular cleaning is halted, the figure quickly becomes obscured. Periodic scouring continues, organised by the National Trust. On Chalking Day, volunteers with hammers, buckets of chalk, and kneepads kneel and "smash the chalk to a paste, whitening the paths cut in the grass inch by inch."

== Nearby prehistoric features ==
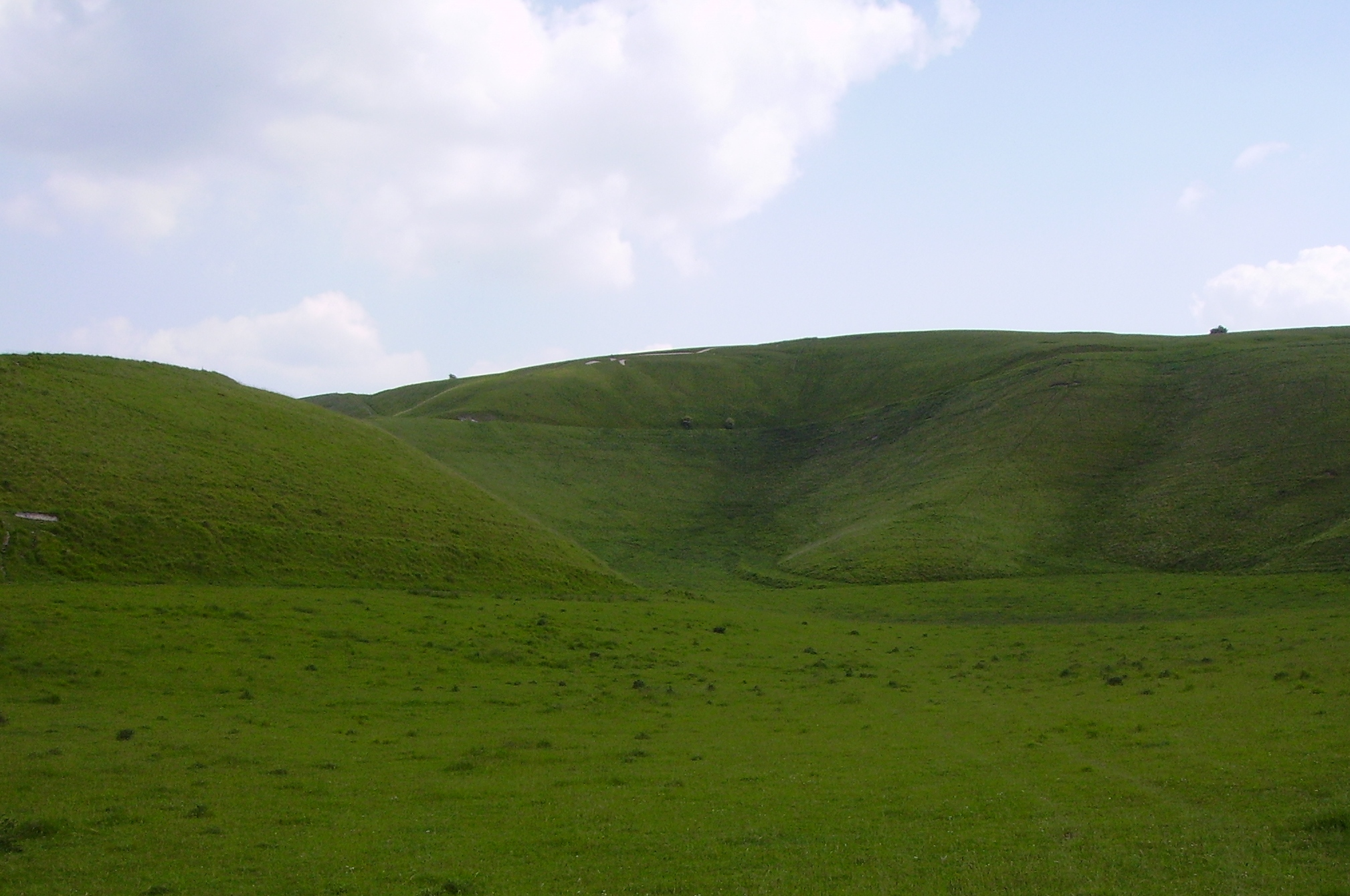
The Manger, with the White Horse at centre skyline and Dragon Hill (left)

The most significant nearby feature is the Iron Age Uffington Castle, located on higher ground atop a knoll above the White Horse. This hillfort comprises an area of approximately 3 ha (7.4 acres) enclosed by a single, well-preserved bank and ditch. Dragon Hill is a natural chalk hill with an artificial flat top, associated in legend with St George.

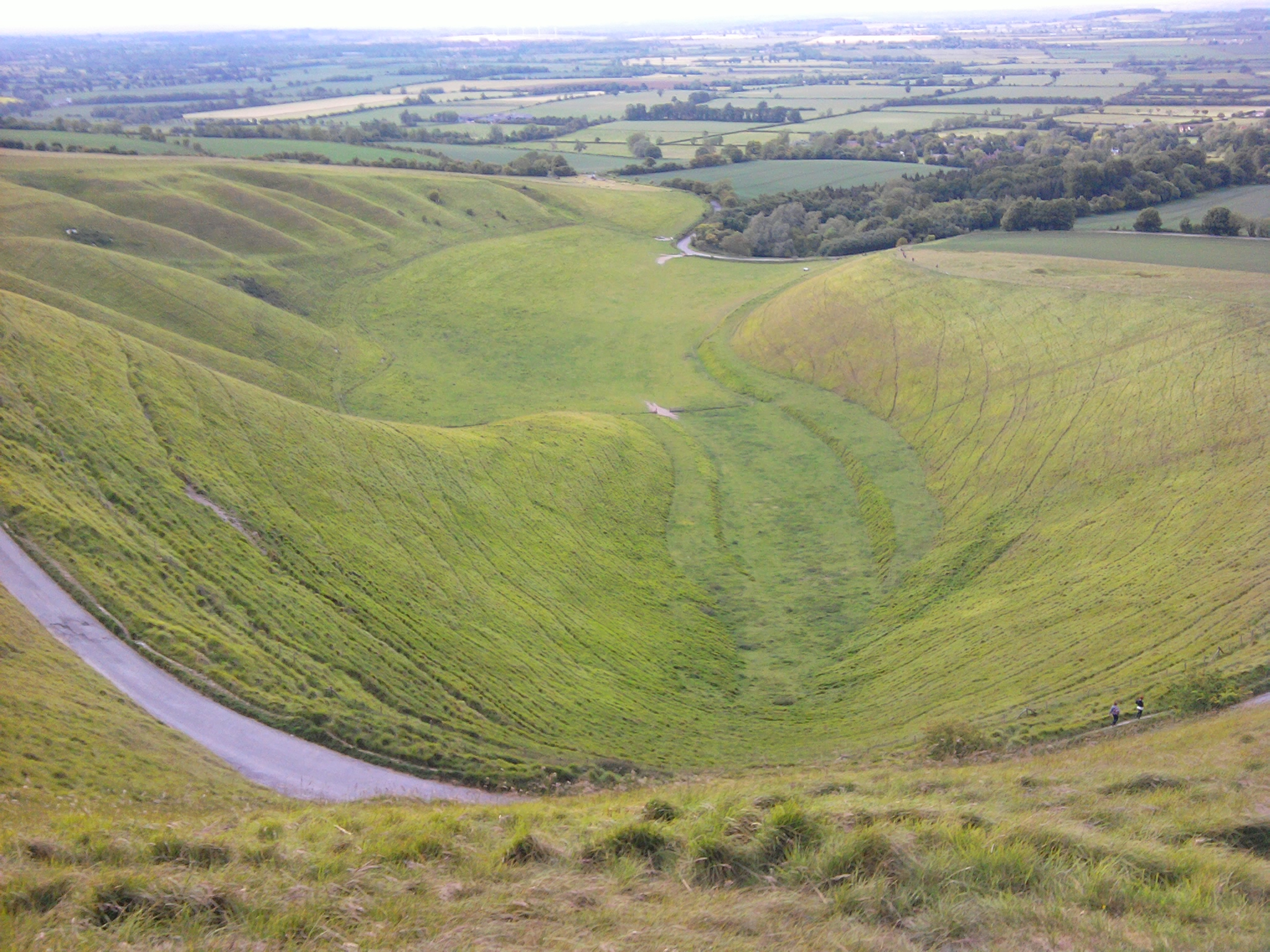
The Manger viewed from the White Horse

Whitehorse Hill is designated a Site of Special Scientific Interest (SSSI). It is a geological SSSI due to its Pleistocene sediments, and a biological SSSI as it has one of the few remaining unploughed grasslands along the chalk escarpment in Oxfordshire.

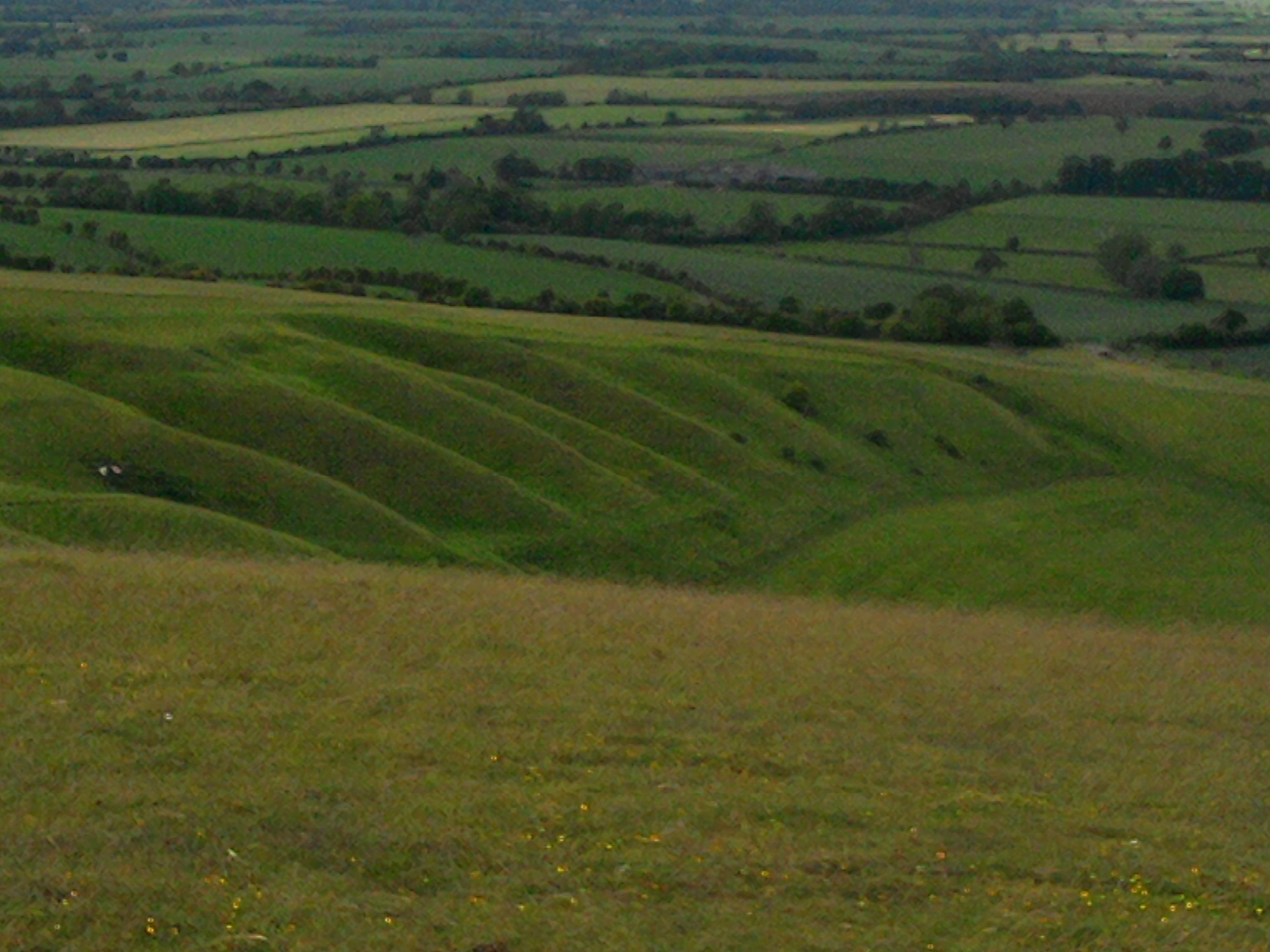
The Giant's Stair, taken from White Horse Hill

To the west are ice-cut terraces known as the "Giant's Stair". Some believe these terraces at the bottom of this valley are the result of medieval farming, or alternatively were used for early farming after being formed by natural processes. The steep sided dry valley below the horse is known as the Manger and legend says that the horse grazes there at night.

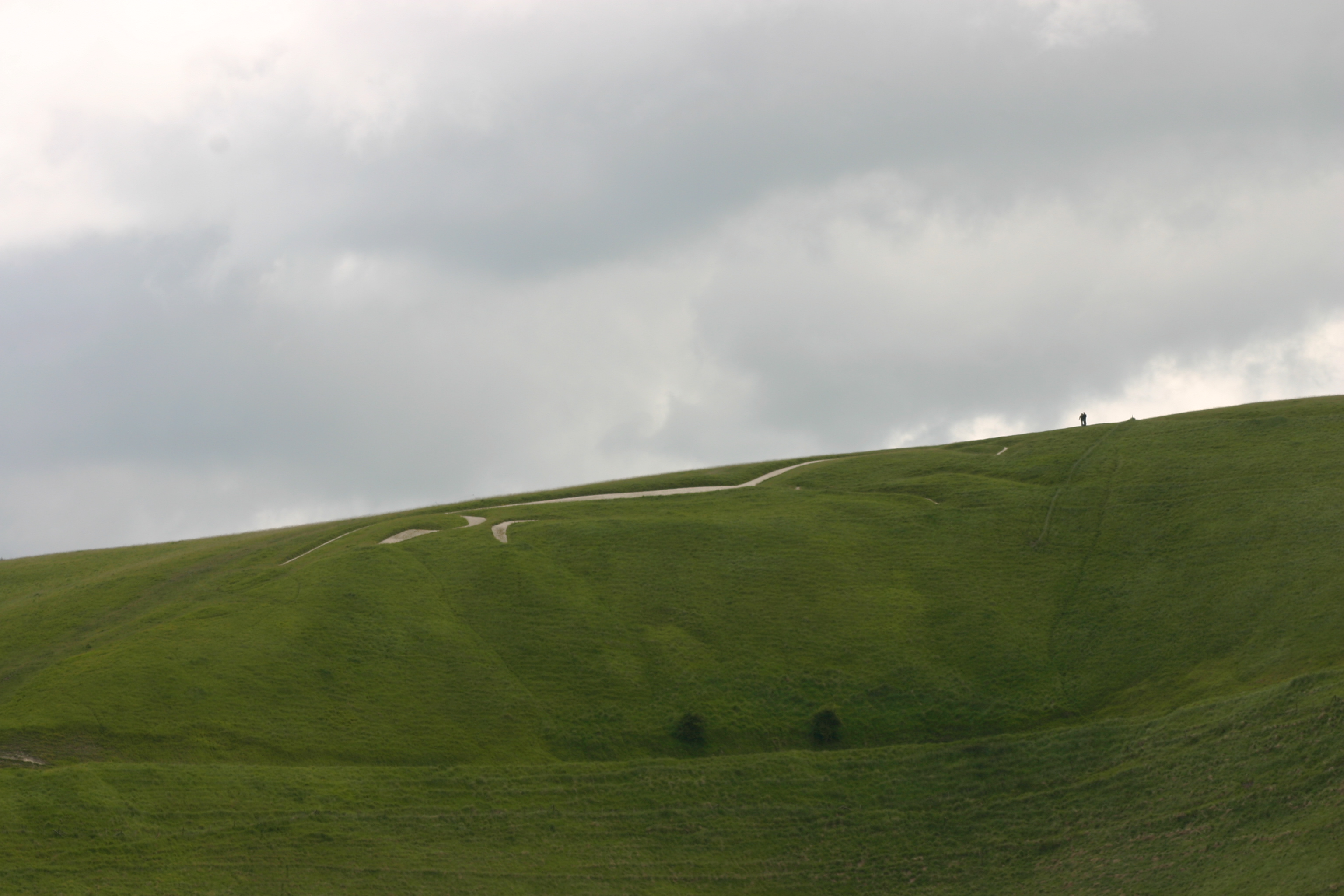
View from Dragon Hill road

The Blowing Stone, a perforated sarsen stone, lies in a garden in Kingston Lisle, 2 km (1.2 mi) away and produces a musical tone when blown through.

Wayland's Smithy is a Neolithic long barrow and chamber tomb 2.4 km (1.5 mi) southwest of the Horse. It lies next to The Ridgeway, an ancient trackway that also runs behind Uffington Castle, and is followed by the Ridgeway National Trail, a long-distance footpath running from Overton Hill, near Avebury, to Ivinghoe Beacon in Buckinghamshire.

In 2019, a group of workers laying water pipes near Letcombe Bassett unearthed an almost 3,000 year-old settlement that archaeologists believe to belong to the same community involved in the creation of the Uffington White Horse. The find includes tools, animal bones and the remains of 26 people whose skeletons suggest human sacrifice.

== Influence and cultural references ==
The horse was a direct influence on much later hill figures of white horses, including Kilburn White Horse (1858) in Yorkshire, Folkestone White Horse (2003) at the Channel Tunnel terminal near Kent, and a white horse cut from heather that existed from 1981 until the mid-1990s in Mossley, Greater Manchester. The first Westbury White Horse, which faced left, is believed to have been inspired by the Uffington horse. The Uffington White Horse has inspired lookalike hill figures, including one facing left in Ciudad Juárez, Mexico. Direct replicas of the Uffington horse can be found at Cockington Green Gardens in Australia and Hogansville, Georgia, U.S. Uffington White Horse has inspired two sculptures in Wiltshire, namely Julie Livsey's White Horse Pacified (1987) in nearby Swindon, a town which was also once considered for a white horse, and Charlotte Moreton's White Horse (2010) in Solstice Park, Amesbury.

The White Horse is used as a symbol by diverse organisations (mostly with Oxfordshire or Berkshire connections) and appears in numerous works of literature, visual art and music.

=== As an emblem ===
The White Horse is the emblem of the Vale of White Horse District Council, the Berkshire Yeomanry (an Army Reserve unit based in Windsor), and educational establishments including Faringdon Community College, The Ridgeway School and Sixth Form College in Wroughton, Wiltshire, and The Ridgeway Primary School in Whitley, Berkshire.

=== Literature ===
Thomas Hughes, the author of Tom Brown's Schooldays, who was born in the nearby village of Uffington, wrote a book called The Scouring of the White Horse. Published in 1859, and described as "a combined travel book and record of regional history in the guise of a novel, sort of", it recounts the traditional festivities surrounding the periodic renovation of the White Horse. In Idylls of the King, written between 1859 and 1885, Tennyson compares King Arthur's removal of certain corrupt judges, who had been installed by his predecessor, Uther, to the way in which "Men weed the White Horse on the Berkshire hills, to keep him bright and clean as heretofore." G.K. Chesterton also features the scouring of the White Horse in his epic poem The Ballad of the White Horse, published in 1911, a romanticised depiction of the exploits of King Alfred the Great.

In modern fiction, Rosemary Sutcliff's 1977 children's book Sun Horse, Moon Horse tells a fictional story of the Bronze Age creator of the figure, and the White Horse and nearby Wayland's Smithy feature in a 1920s setting in the Inspector Ian Rutledge mystery/detective novel A Pale Horse by Charles Todd; a depiction of the White Horse appears on the book's dust jacket. Tom Shippey suggests that the horse may have inspired the banner flown by the horsemen of Rohan in J.R.R. Tolkien's Middle Earth legendarium, which is a white horse upon a green field. The horse is central to the 1978 BBC Television serial The Moon Stallion by Brian Hayles, who later novelised the series.

"The horse on the chalk" in Terry Pratchett's Tiffany Aching series is inspired by the Uffington White Horse. Pratchett (who is famous for his sardonic humor) said "By an amazing coincidence, the horse carved on the chalk in A Hat Full of Sky (2004) is remarkably similar to the Uffington White Horse." In the same book, it is described as "Not what a horse looks like, but what a horse be."

The White Horse is a significant setting, plot point, and symbol in the 2018 novel Lethal White, the fourth instalment in the Cormoran Strike detective series, and inspired the 2022 A. F. Steadman novel Skandar and The Unicorn Thief. The White Horse is also an important narrative element of the 2022 video game tie-in novel Assassin's Creed Valhalla: Sword of the White Horse written by Elsa Sjunneson.

=== Music ===
John Gardner's Ballad of the White Horse (1959) was inspired by Chesterton's epic poem of the same name. It was recently recorded by the City of London Choir, accompanied by the BBC Concert Orchestra, and conducted by Hilary Davan Wetton.

David Bedford's Song of the White Horse (1978), set for ensemble and children's choir and commissioned for the BBC's Omnibus programme, depicts a journey along a footpath alongside the Uffington Horse and includes words from Chesterton's poem. The composition requires the choir to inhale helium to sing the "stratospherically high notes" of the climax, accompanied by aerial footage of the horse animated to show it rearing up from the ground. A recording, produced by Mike Oldfield, was released by Oldfield Music in 1983.

The Uffington Horse is illustrated on the cover of English Settlement (1982), the fifth studio album by the Swindon band XTC, and appears (among other symbols copied from Barbara G. Walker's The Woman's Dictionary of Symbols and Sacred Objects) on the back cover of Nirvana's final album, In Utero (1993). Painted in 2024, a public mural of the English Settlement sleeve, prominently depicting the Uffington Horse, features on Crombey Street, Swindon.

== See also ==
- Cerne Abbas Giant
- Long Man of Wilmington
- List of Sites of Special Scientific Interest in Oxfordshire
- Watlington White Mark (another Oxfordshire hill figure)

== Sources and further reading ==
- Bramwell, Peter (2009). Pagan Themes in Modern Children's Fiction: Green Man, Shamanism, Earth Mysteries. New York: Palgrave Macmillan. ISBN 978-0-230-21839-0.
- Darvill, Timothy (1996). Prehistoric Britain from the Air: A study of space, time and society. Cambridge, UK: Cambridge University Press. ISBN 0-521-55132-3.
- Dyer, J. (2001). Discovering Prehistoric England. Oxford, UK: Shire Books. ISBN 0-7478-0507-5.
- Miles, David; Palmer, Simon; Lock, Gary; Gosden, Chris; Cromarty, Anne Marie (2003). Uffington White Horse and its Landscape: Investigations at White Horse Hill, Uffington, 1989–95, and Tower Hill, Ashbury, 1993–4. Thames Valley Landscape Series. Vol. 18. Oxford, UK: Oxford University School of Archaeology. ISBN 0-947816-77-1.
- Plenderleath, W.C., Rev. (1892). The White Horses of the West of England. London, UK: Allen & Storr.
- Woolner, Diana (1967). "New light on the White Horse". Folklore. 78 (2): 90–111. doi:10.1080/0015587X.1967.9717080. JSTOR 1258648.
