= Uffington Castle =

Hillfort in Oxfordshire, England

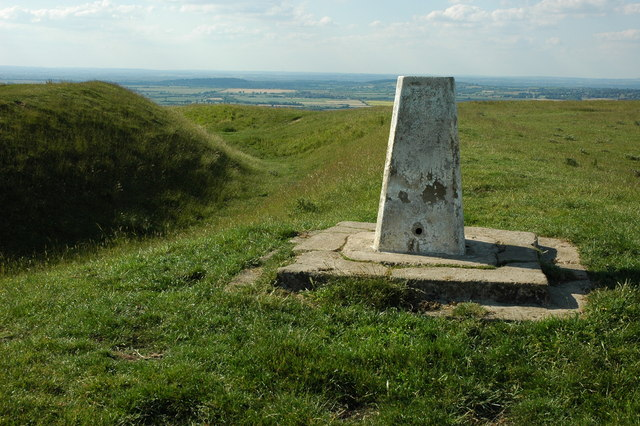
- Ramparts of Uffington Castle at Whitehorse Hill, the highest point in Oxfordshire.
- Interactive map of Uffington Castle
- Type: Hillfort
- Periods: Iron Age
- Coordinates: 51°34′30″N 1°34′09″W
- Location: Whitehorse Hill, between Swindon and Wantage. (SU299863)
- Region: Oxfordshire England

History
- Condition: substantial earthworks
- Archaeologists: David Miles, Oxford Archaeological Unit
- Excavation dates: 1995

Site notes
- Public access: Yes
- Website: English Heritage

Scheduled monument
- Designated: 1882
- Reference no.: 1008412

Uffington Castle is an early Iron Age (with underlying Bronze Age) univallate hillfort in Oxfordshire, England. It covers about 3.2 ha (7.9 acres) and is surrounded by two earth banks separated by a ditch with an entrance in the western end. A second entrance in the eastern end was apparently blocked up a few centuries after it was built. The original defensive ditch was V-shaped with a small box rampart in front and a larger one behind it. Timber posts stood on the ramparts. Later the ditch was deepened and the extra material dumped on top of the ramparts to increase their size. A parapet wall of sarsen stones lined the top of the innermost rampart. It is very close to the Uffington White Horse on White Horse Hill.

Uffington White Horse, sketched by William Plenderleath in The White Horses of the West of England (1892)

== Excavations ==
Excavations have indicated that it was probably built in the 8th or 7th century BCE and continued to be occupied throughout the Iron Age. Isolated postholes were found inside the fort but no evidence of buildings. Pottery, loom weights and animal bone finds suggest some form of occupation however. The most activity appears to have been during the Roman period as the artefacts recovered from the upper fills of the ditch attest. The ramparts were remodelled to provide more entrances, and a shrine seems to have been built in the early 4th century CE. Two oblong mounds, one containing 46 Romano-British burials and one containing eight Saxon burials, lie nearby.

== The Ridgeway ==
An ancient track passes by the northern entrance to the hillfort; it is known as The Ridgeway. It links to the Icknield Way at the Goring Gap, and passes close to Avebury before heading south across Salisbury Plain. It also passes very close to a Neolithic chambered long barrow, Waylands Smithy, about a mile to the west.

== Protection ==
The hillfort is a Scheduled Monument, and was included in the Ancient Monuments Protection Act 1882 as one of the first 68 sites in Britain and Ireland to receive legal protection. Along with the Uffington White Horse on the slopes below the ramparts, it is in the care of English Heritage.

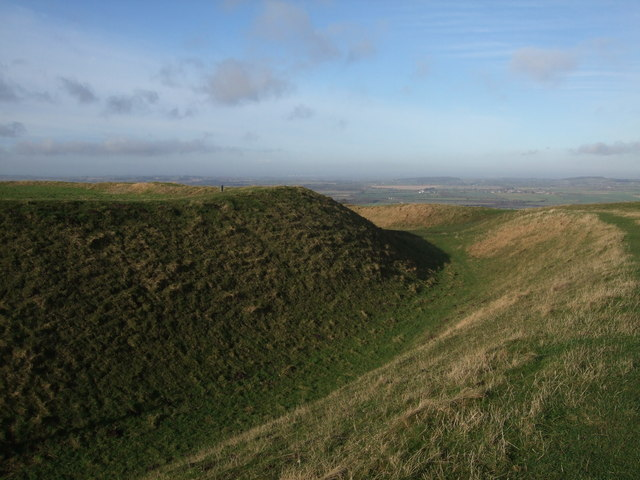
Ditch and ramparts

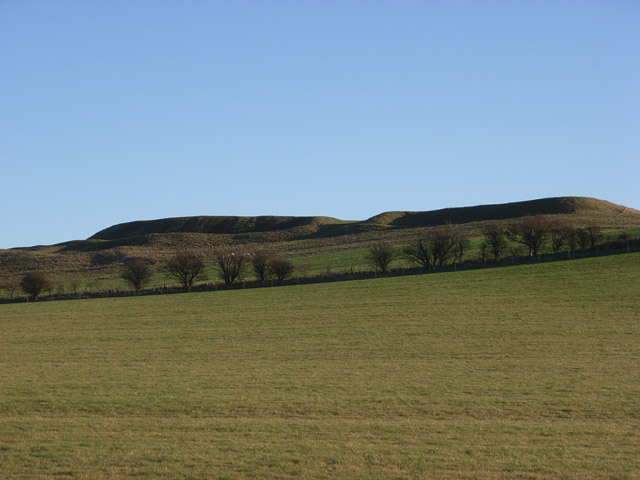
Western side

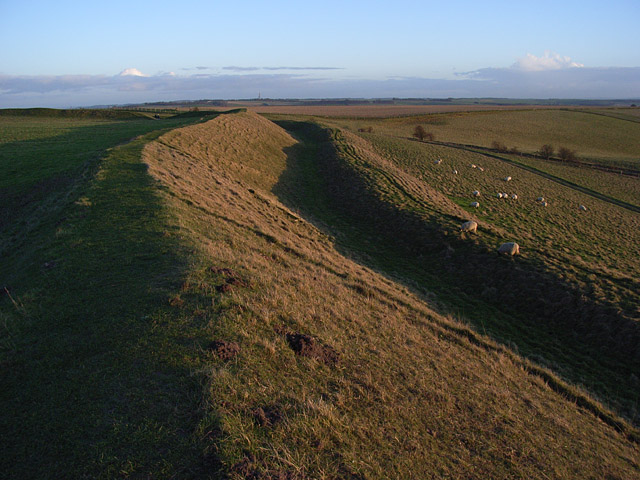
Ditch and bank on the southeast side
