= Wayland's Smithy =

Neolithic long barrow and chamber tomb site in Oxfordshire, England

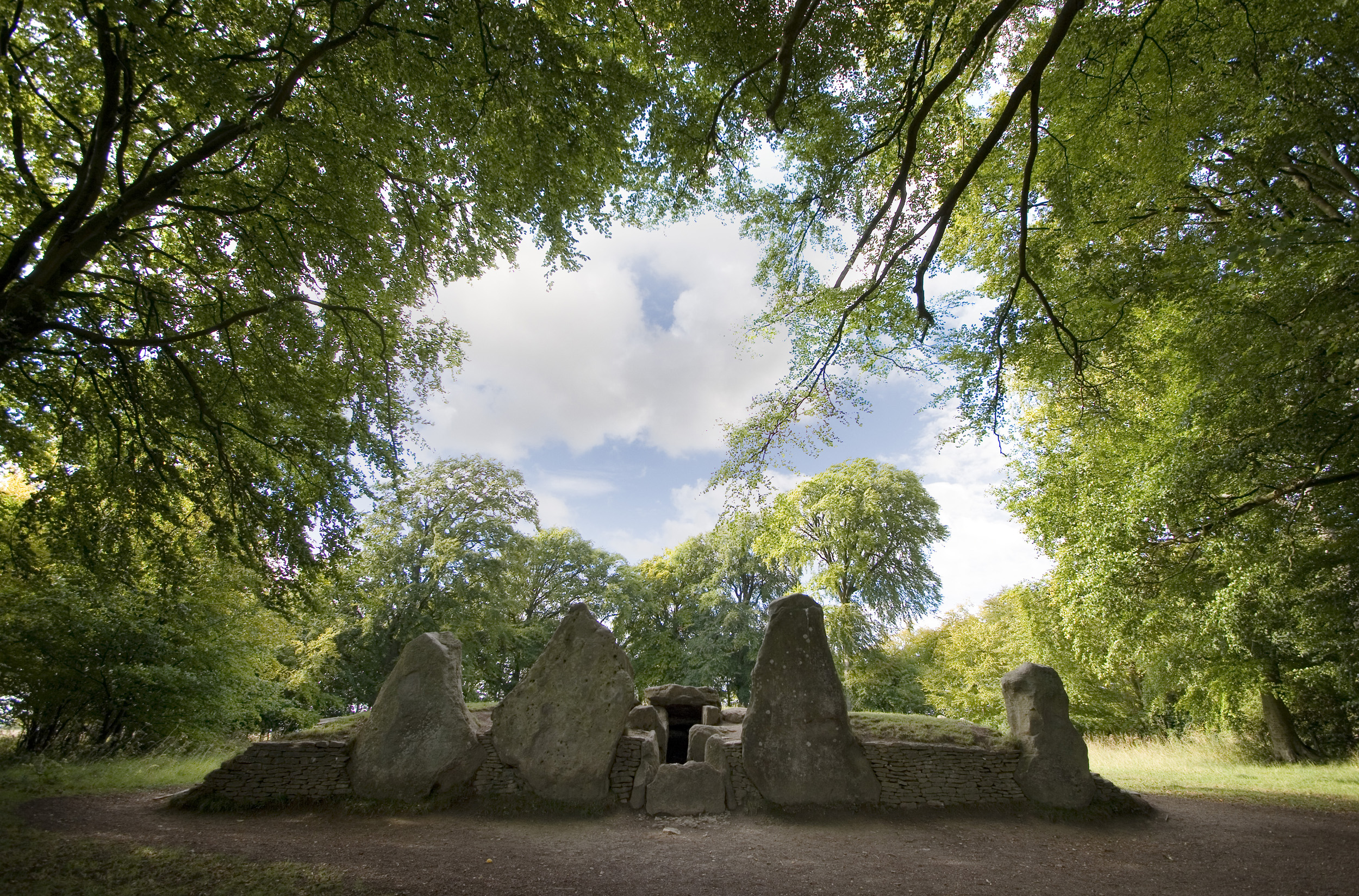
- The long barrow entrance

- Map showing location in Oxfordshire
- 51°34′00″N 1°35′46″W
- Type: long barrow and chamber tomb
- Periods: Neolithic
- Location: England, United Kingdom
- Region: Oxfordshire England

History
- Built: c. 3570 BC - c. 3430 BC

Site notes
- Material: Stone
- Excavation dates: 1962-1963
- Archaeologists: Stuart Piggott
- Condition: Restored
- Public access: Yes
- Website: English Heritage

Scheduled monument
- Official name: Wayland's Smithy chambered long barrow, including an earlier barrow and Iron Age and Roman boundary ditches
- Designated: 18 August 1882
- Reference no.: 1008409

Wayland's Smithy is an Early Neolithic chambered long barrow located near the village of Ashbury in the south-central English county of Oxfordshire. The barrow is believed to have been completed around 3430 BCE by pastoral communities shortly after the introduction of agriculture to the British Isles from continental Europe. Although part of an architectural tradition of long barrow building that was widespread across Neolithic Europe, Wayland's Smithy belongs to a localised regional variant of barrows—found only in south-west of Britain—known as the Severn-Cotswold group. Wayland's Smithy is one of the best surviving examples of this type of barrow.

The site's appearance is a result of restoration following excavations undertaken by archaeologists, Stuart Piggott and Richard Atkinson, from 1962–1963. Their research of the site showed it had been built in two different phases. First as a timber-chambered oval barrow built around 3590 and 3550 BCE and then later as a stone-chambered long barrow in around 3460 to 3400 BCE. The barrow is on the same hill range as Uffington White Horse and Uffington Castle; it is also close to The Ridgeway, the ancient trackway across the Berkshire Downs.

The barrow, which is a scheduled monument, is under the guardianship of English Heritage and open all year round. It has been used as a ritual site in modern Paganism since the late 20th century.

== Toponym ==
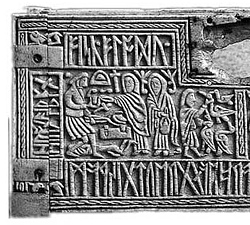
The right half of the front panel of the 7th century Franks Casket, depicting the legend of Wayland the Smith

Wayland's Smithy is one of many prehistoric sites associated with Wayland or Wolund, a Germanic smith-god. This character appears in Norse mythology, and a depiction of him is believed to be present on the Franks Casket, on display in the British Museum in London. It was most likely named by the Saxons who settled in the area some four thousand years after Wayland's Smithy was built. The first recorded mention of the name is in an early medieval land deed (908 AD) from Compton Beauchamp, which documented in a charter from King Eadred in 955 AD.

== Description ==
The Early Neolithic era was a revolutionary period of British history. Between 4500 and 3800 BC, it saw a widespread change in lifestyle as the communities living in the British Isles adopted agriculture as their primary form of subsistence, abandoning the hunter-gatherer lifestyle that had characterised the preceding Mesolithic period. This came about through contact with continental societies, although it is unclear to what extent this can be attributed to an influx of migrants or to indigenous Mesolithic Britons adopting agricultural technologies from the continent.

With new technologies, Neolithic societies in Britain began to emulate European funerary practices. The wooden mortuary house mainly consisted of a paved stone floor with two large posts at either end. A single crouched burial had been placed at one end and, the mostly disarticulated remains of a further 14 individuals were scattered in front of it. Analysis of these remains indicated that they had been subjected to excarnation before burial and deposited in possibly four different phases. Postholes at one end have been interpreted as supporting a timber facade. An earth barrow covered the whole monument with material excavated from two flanking ditches and measured around 15 feet (4.6 m) wide and 6 feet (1.8 m) deep.

The later stone tomb consists of two opposing transept chambers and terminal chamber; along with the longer entrance chamber, this gives the burial area a cruciform appearance in plan. At the entrance four large sarsen stones stand (originally six, but two are lost), having been returned to their upright locations following the 1962 excavations. It is classified by archaeologists as one of the Severn-Cotswold tombs. The large trapezoidal earth barrow erected over it was revetted with a stone kerb and its material was again excavated from two large flanking ditches. Excavation in 1919 revealed the jumbled remains of seven adults and one child.

The site is important as it illustrates a transition from a timber-chambered barrow to stone-chamber tomb over a period that may have been as short as 50 years. Carbon dating of the burials in the second tomb suggests it was a late use of this style of burial, being similar to West Kennet Long Barrow, which had been in use 200 years before.

== Antiquarian historiography ==
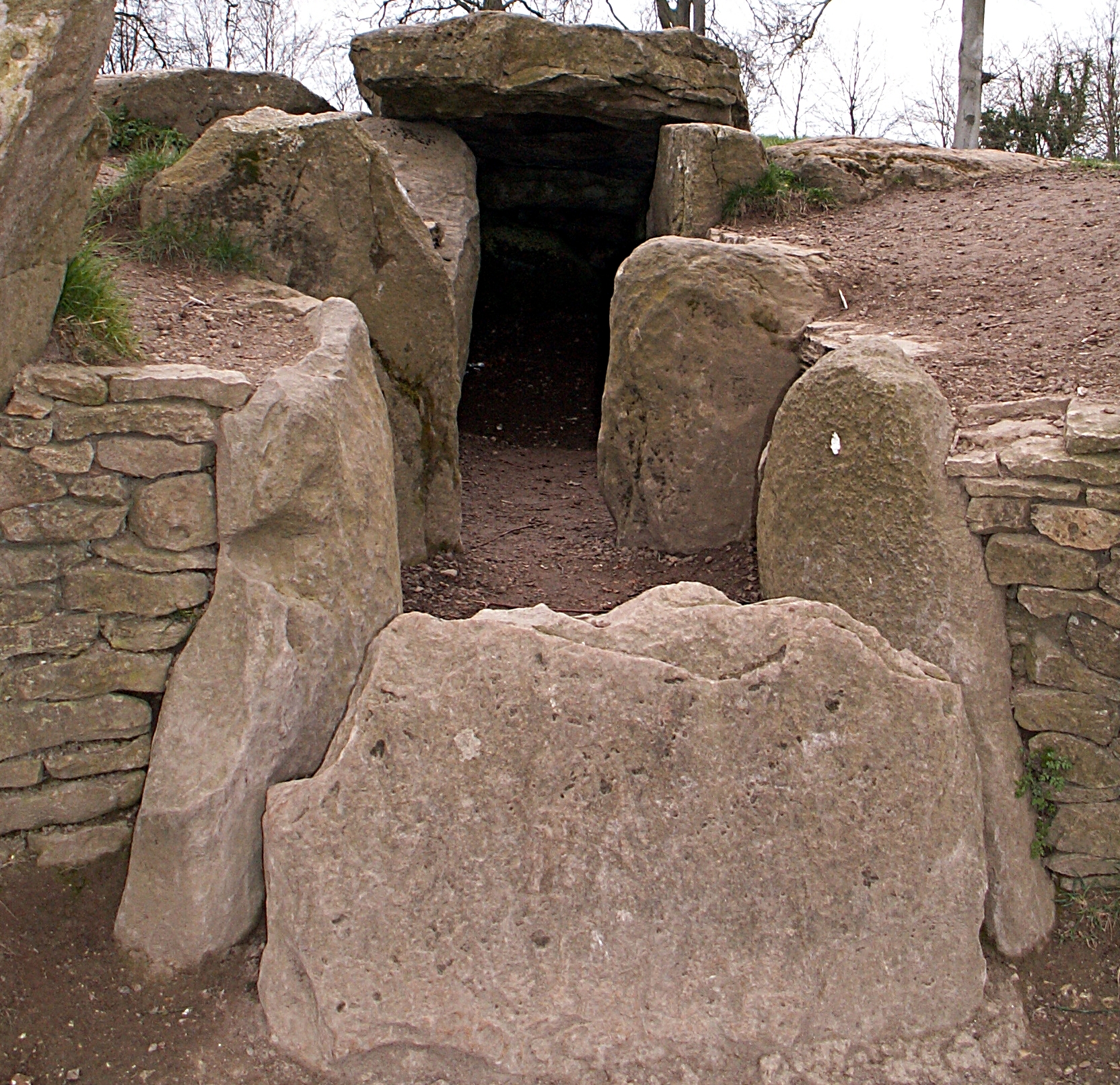
Restored entrance into Wayland's Smithy

In 1738, Francis Wise, who was then the under-keeper of the Bodleian Library, recorded a belief held about the site in local folklore. Like several other early commentators, Wise referred to the site not as "Wayland's Smithy", but only as "Wayland Smith". Wise related that:

All the account which the country people are able to give of it is 'At this place lived formerly an invisible Smith, and if a traveller's Horse had lost a Shoe upon the road, he had no more to do than to bring the Horse to this place with a piece of money, and leaving both there for some little time, he might come again and find the money gone, but the Horse new shod.

The site was also mentioned in a letter sent to the antiquarian William Stukeley by his daughter Anna on 3 October 1758. There is some folklore associating witch relics with the site. It is referred to as "Wayland Smith's Forge" in Walter Scott's 1821 novel Kenilworth. In 1828, a one-inch Ordnance Survey map recorded the site's name as being "Wayland Smith's Forge". The folklorist and archaeologist Leslie Grinsell suggested that the decision to name it this on the map was influenced by Scott's novel.

== Modern use ==
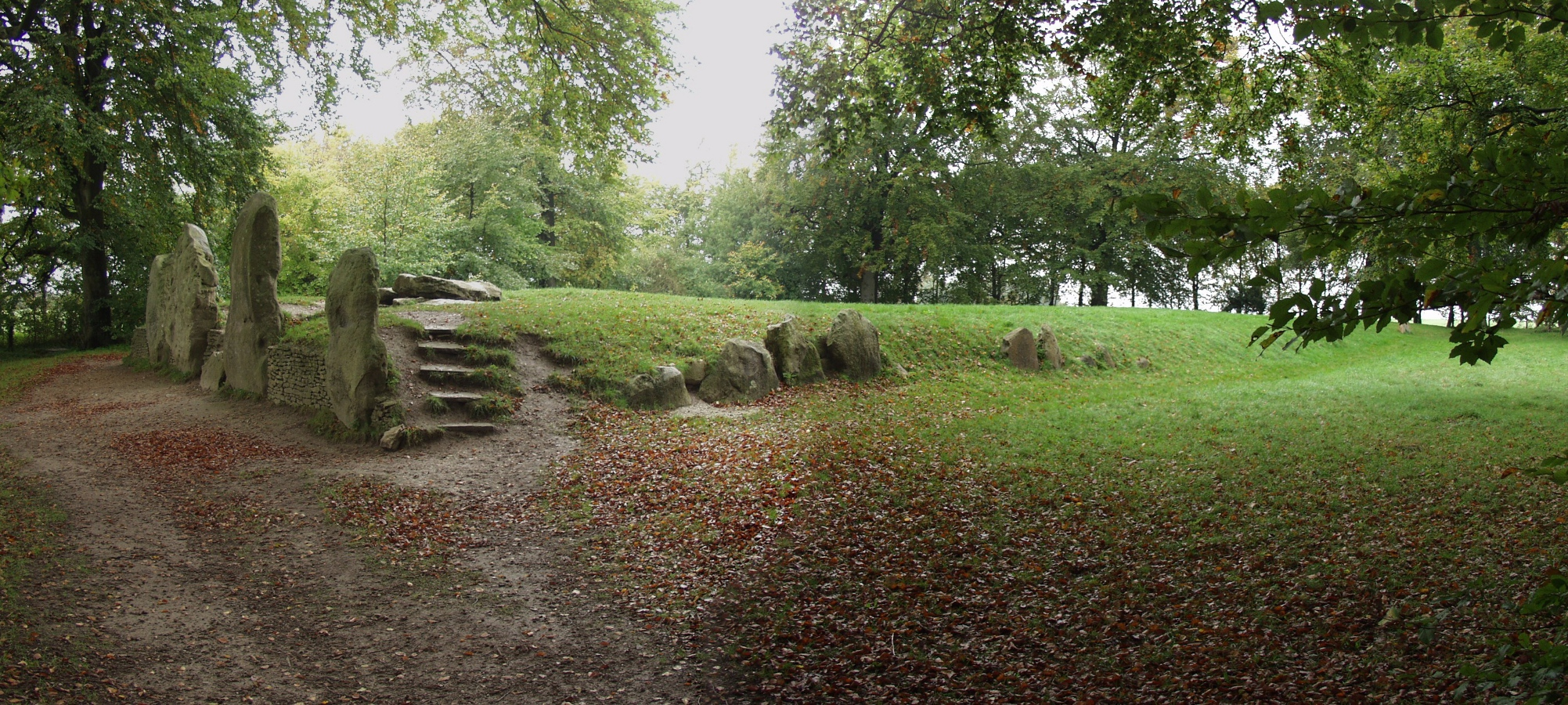
The site is used for rituals by Modern Pagans

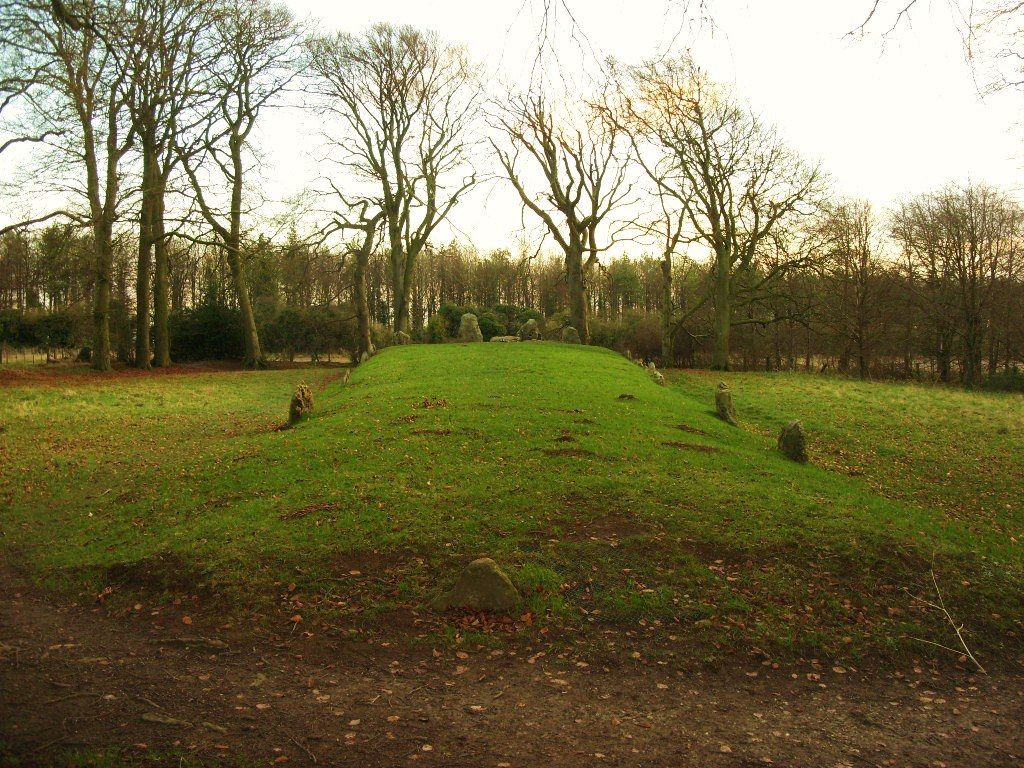
The top of the barrow

The deposition of coins at the site has taken place since at least the 1960s, with visitors lodging the coins into cracks in the site's stones. As of 2015, the local wardens from The National Trust are tasked with removing said deposits, and around 2010, English Heritage removed information about the coin deposition custom from the site's information panel. The coins removed by the wardens are then donated to local charities. As the folklorist Ceri Houlbrook noted, all of this deposited material "contributes to the ritual narrative of a site".

Modern Pagans, including Druids and Heathens use Wayland's Smithy for ritual purposes. Anthropologist Thorsten Gieser thinks the modern ritualistic use of the site by new age religions to communicate with "ancestors", "spirits of the earth", and an "earth goddess" is symbolic of its folkloric links to Wayland and its use as a prehistoric burial ground. However, in 2019, concern were raised that one of the groups using the site for their rituals was "Woden's Folk", a neo-Nazi Heathen movement. The National Trust said it would increase the number of times its rangers visited the site.

== Cultural references ==
Walter Scott's Elizabethan novel Kenilworth (published 1821) features both a chambered underground dwelling and a farrier living in it named 'Wayland Smith'.

Susan Cooper's The Dark is Rising series of young-adult novels features a supporting character named Wayland Smith, and deals greatly with English lore and legend.

Julian Cope included a song called "Wayland's Smithy Has Wings" on his 1992 album The Skellington Chronicles.

Author Patricia Kennealy-Morrison has a protagonist named Turk Wayland in her Rennie Stride mystery series, and sets a scene at the end of the fourth book, A Hard Slay's Night: Murder at the Royal Albert Hall, at Wayland's Smithy.

Rudyard Kipling, in his interlinked collection of stories Puck of Pook's Hill, set many of the stories near the Smithy, and told of the arrival of the smith god in the first.

Both the Uffington White Horse and Wayland's Smithy were incorporated into the BBC miniseries The Moon Stallion, produced in 1978. In the serial, set in 1906, the stones are associated with witchcraft.

The British music group Radiohead recorded a music video here for their non-album single "Pop Is Dead".
