= Dragon Hill =

Dragon Hill may refer to:

- Dragon Hill, la colina del dragón, a 2002 Spanish film
- Dragon Hill, Uffington, a small hillock in the English county of Oxfordshire
