= Kingston Lisle =

Village in Oxfordshire, England

Coordinates: 51.586°N 1.532°W

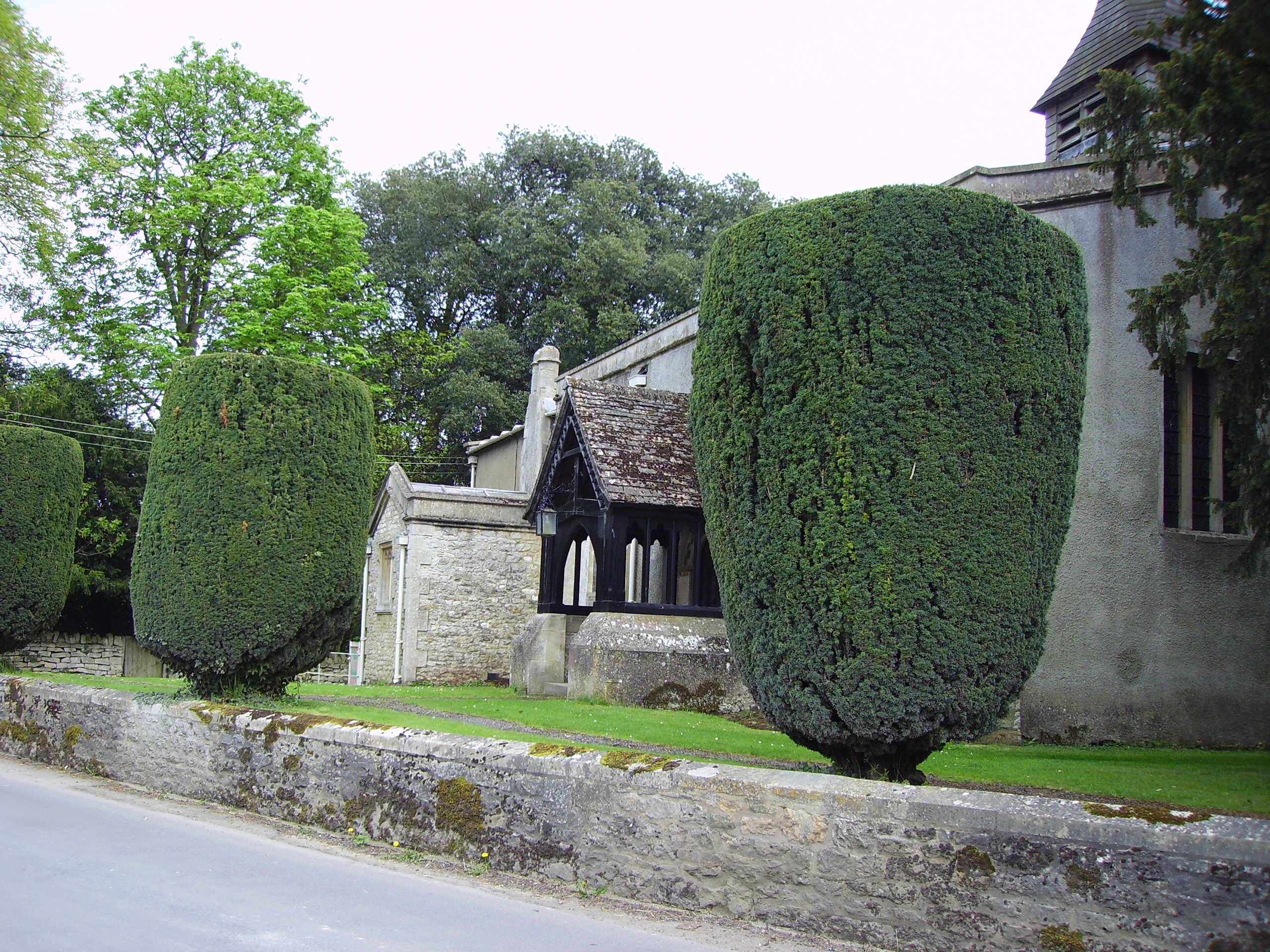
- St. John the Baptist parish church

- Location within Oxfordshire
- Population: 225 (2011 Census)
- OS grid reference: SU325876
  - London: 64 miles (103 km)
- Civil parish: Kingston Lisle
- District: Vale of White Horse
- Shire county: Oxfordshire
- Region: South East
- Country: England
- Sovereign state: United Kingdom
- Post town: Wantage
- Postcode district: OX12
- Dialling code: 01367
- Police: Thames Valley
- Fire: Oxfordshire
- Ambulance: South Central
- UK Parliament: Didcot and Wantage
- Website: Kingston Lisle

Kingston Lisle is a village and civil parish in the Vale of White Horse, England, about 4 1/2 miles (7 km) west of Wantage and 5 miles (8 km) south-southeast of Faringdon. The parish includes the hamlet of Fawler, about 1/2 mile (800 m) west of Kingston Lisle village. The 2011 Census recorded the parish population as 225. Kingston Lisle was part of Berkshire until the 1974 local government boundary changes transferred the Vale of White Horse to Oxfordshire.

== Geography ==
The village is a spring line settlement at the foot of Blowing Stone Hill, which is part of the escarpment of the Berkshire Downs. The parish measures about 4 1/2 miles (7 km) north – south and about 1 1/4 miles (2 km) wide at its widest point. The highest point in the parish is Rams Hill, whose top is 764 feet (233 m) above sea level. Rams Hill is on the Berkshire Downs escarpment about 1 mile (1.6 km) southwest of the village and on the parish boundary with Uffington.

== Archaeology ==
The Ridgeway passes through the parish less than 1 mile (1.6 km) south of the village. It is a prehistoric road that is now a long-distance footpath. The Blowing Stone, a sarsen with holes in it, is about 1/4 mile (400 m) south of the village. Legend has it that King Alfred the Great blew through it to summon his troops for the Battle of Ashdown in 871.

== Toponym ==
"Kingston" is a common English toponym. It means simply a tūn of the king. Tūn is Old English for a fence, and hence came to mean an enclosure, farm or manor. An entry for 1220 in the Book of Fees records it as Kingeston. The suggestion that it is derived from "King's Stone", referring to the Blowing Stone, is false etymology. The suffix "Lisle" was added in the 14th century, when it was the surname of the lord of the manor. 14th-century Charter Rolls record it as Kyngeston Lisle in 1322 and Kingston del Isle in 1336. It distinguishes the village and parish from Kingston Bagpuize, which is 8 miles (13 km) to the northeast.

== Parish church ==
The nave and chancel of the Church of England parish church of Saint John the Baptist was built in about 1200. The chancel windows are each 14th-century Decorated Gothic. Some 14th-century stained glass survives in a south window of the chancel. Around the east and north windows of the chancel are 14th-century murals of Saint Peter, Saint Paul, and the martyrdom of Saint John the Baptist. The church is a Grade II* listed building. St John's parish is part of the Ridgeway Benefice, along with the parishes of Childrey, Letcombe Bassett, Letcombe Regis, Sparsholt and West Challow.

== Economic and social history ==
The Domesday Book in 1086 records Kingston Lisle as having 31 households. Kingston Lisle Park is a 17th-century country house on the edge of the village. It was enlarged early the 18th and 19th centuries and is a Grade II* listed building. Between 1805 and 1807 the section of the Wilts & Berks Canal between Longcot and Challow was completed. It passes through the parish at Kingston Common about 3/4 mile (1.2 km) north of the village. Traffic on the canal had virtually ceased by 1901 and the route was formally abandoned in 1914. The Wilts & Berks Canal Trust is currently restoring the canal. The Great Western Main Line through the Vale of White Horse was opened in 1840. It passes through the northern extremity of Kingston Lisle parish, about 1 3/4 miles (3 km) north of the village.

== Amenities ==
The village has one pub, the Blowing Stone Inn. The parish is served by Uffington Primary School just over 2 miles (3 km) away.

== In literature ==
The village features in Thomas Hughes' novel Tom Brown's School Days.

== Gallery ==
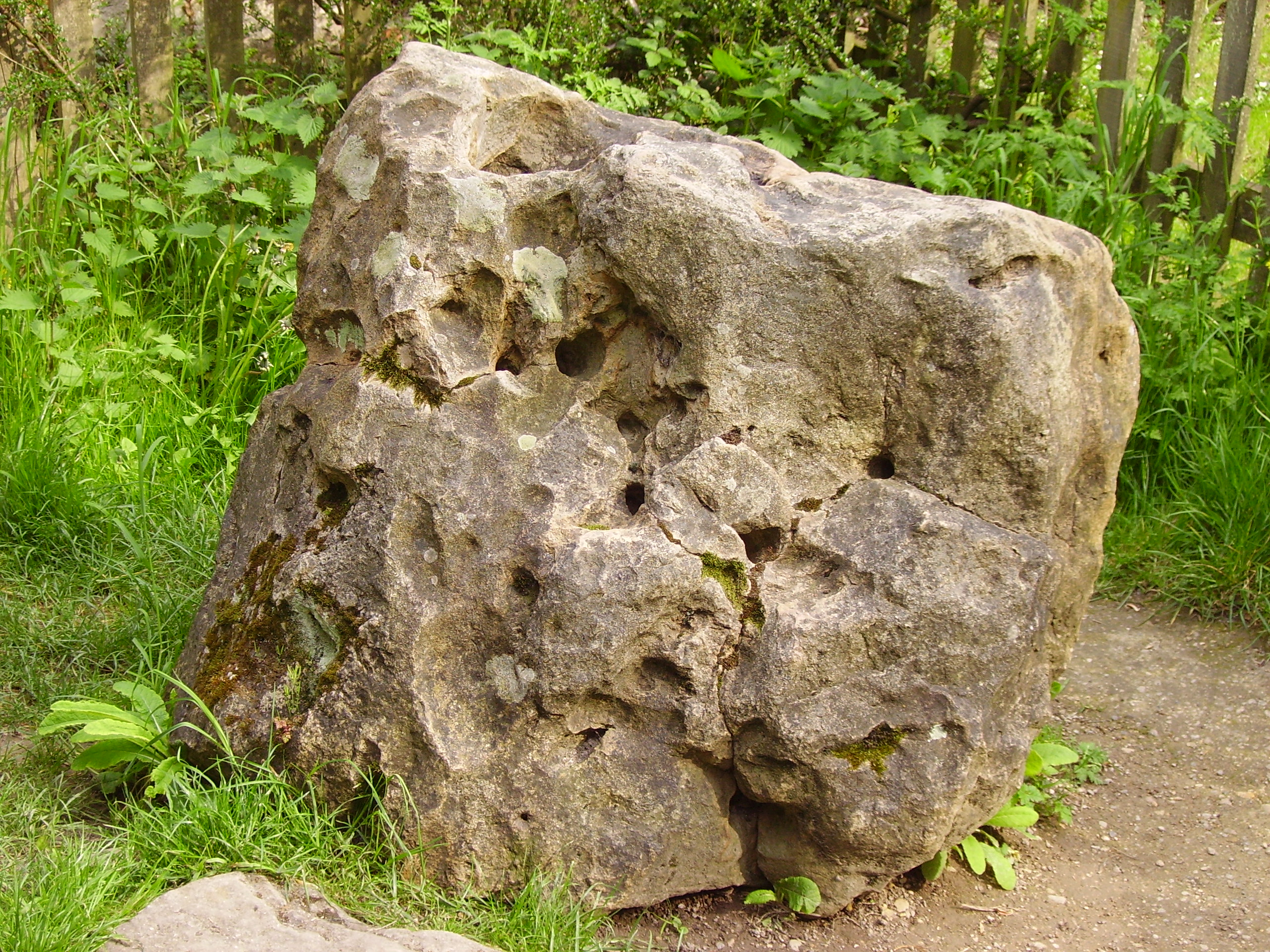
The Blowing Stone

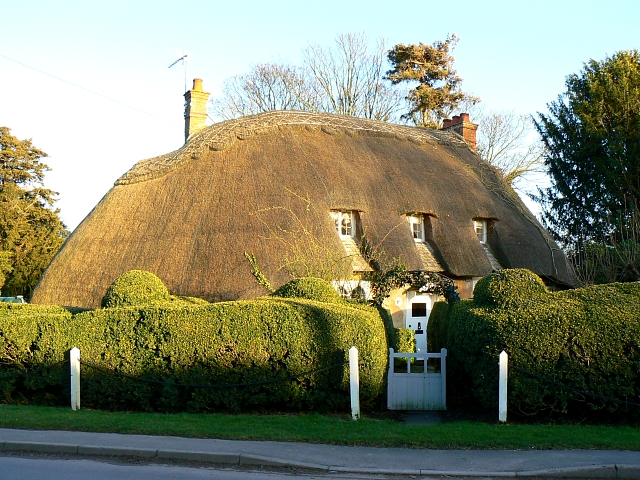
Church Cottage is a 16th-century building with cob walls and thatched roof

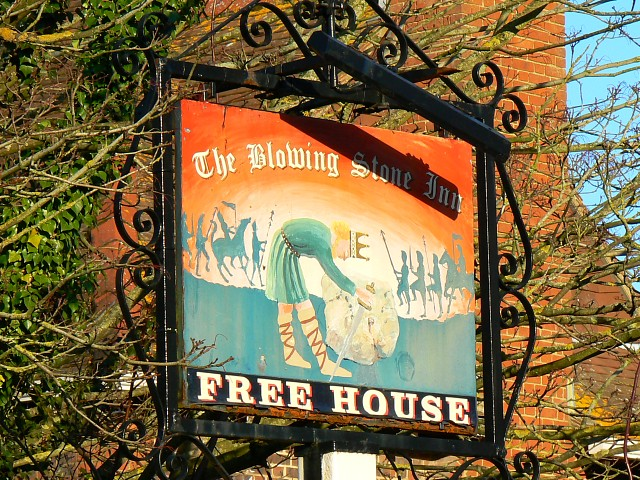
Sign outside the Blowing Stone Inn

== Bibliography ==
- Dalby, LJ (2000) [1971]. The Wilts and Berks Canal (3rd ed.). Usk: Oakwood Press. p. 23. ISBN 0-85361-562-4.
- Ditchfield, PH; Page, William, eds. (1924). "Sparsholt". A History of the County of Berkshire. Victoria County History. Vol. IV. assisted by John Hautenville Cope. London: The St Katherine Press. pp. 311–319.
- Ekwall, Eilert (1960) [1936]. Concise Oxford Dictionary of English Place-Names (4th ed.). Oxford: Oxford University Press. Kingston. ISBN 0198691033.
- Pevsner, Nikolaus (1966). Berkshire. The Buildings of England. Harmondsworth: Penguin Books. pp. 161–162.
