= Blowing Stone =

Sarsen stone in Kingston Lisle, Oxfordshire, England

Coordinates: 51.581686°N 1.533622°W

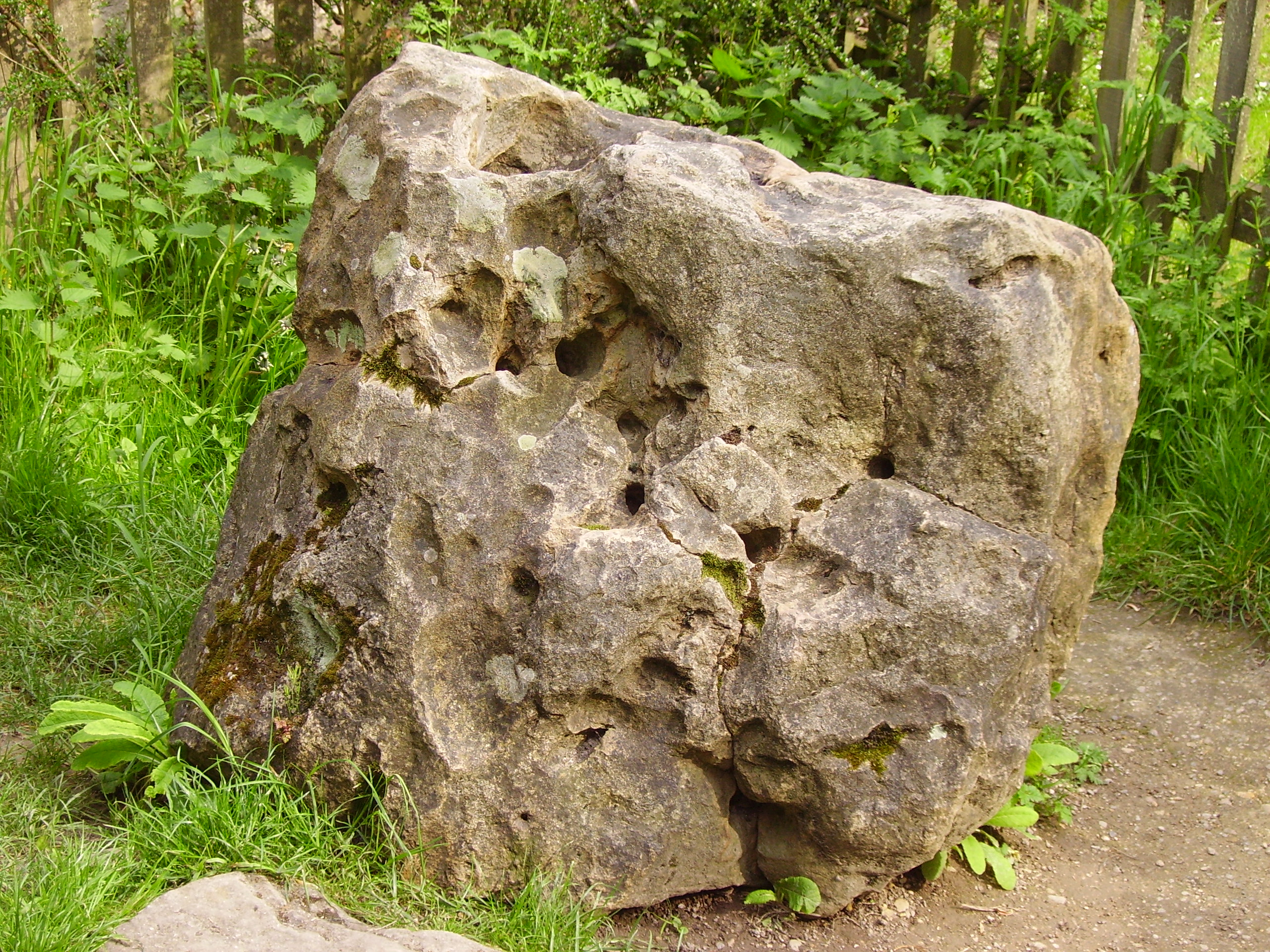
The Blowing Stone in its modern setting

The Blowing Stone is a perforated sarsen in Kingston Lisle, Oxfordshire, England (grid reference SU32412 87083). The stone is in a garden at the foot of Blowingstone Hill just south of the Icknield Way (B4507), about 4 1/2 miles (7 km) west of Wantage and about 1 1/2 miles (2.4 km) east of White Horse Hill.

Blowingstone Hill is part of the escarpment of the Berkshire Downs, at the crest of which is The Ridgeway National Trail.

== Notability ==
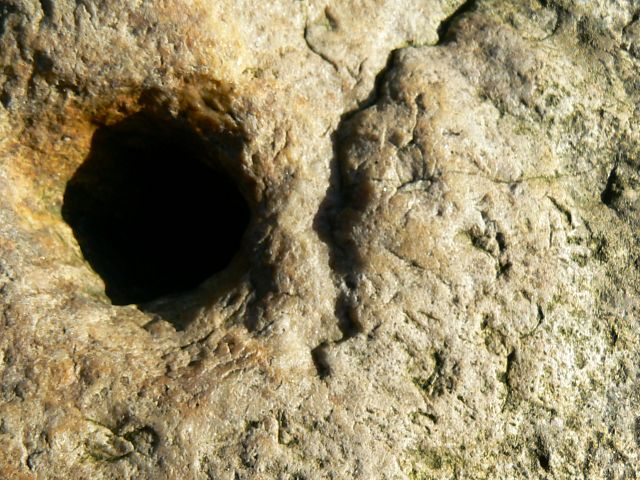
The blowing hole in the stone

The stone is capable of producing a booming sound if someone with the required skill blows into one of the holes the right way. Legend tells that it could be heard atop White Horse Hill, where 19th-century antiquarians thought King Alfred the Great's Saxon troops had camped, and that this was how Alfred summoned them for the Battle of Ashdown against the Danes in 871 CE.

== Literature ==
Thomas Hughes' 1857 novel Tom Brown's School Days refers to it as the Blawing Stwun and calls the village Kingstone Lisle.

It is also one of the "sacred stones" mentioned in William Horwood's Duncton Wood (1980), the first book in his fantasy fiction series about a group of moles.

== See also ==
- List of individual rocks
