= The Ballad of the White Horse =

Poem by G. K. Chesterton

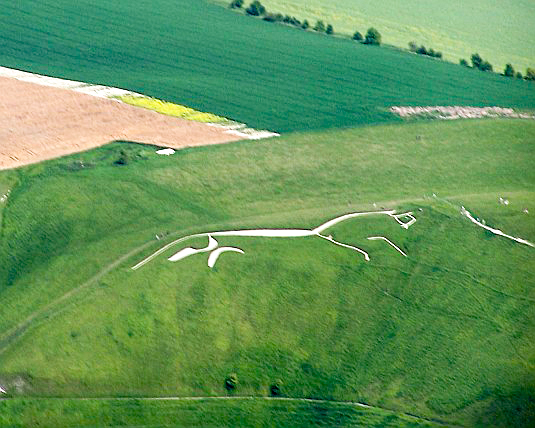
The Uffington White Horse, a prehistoric hill figure in England

The Ballad of the White Horse is a poem by G. K. Chesterton about the idealised exploits of the Saxon King Alfred the Great, published in 1911. Written in ballad form, the work is in the style of a traditional epic poem. The poem narrates how Alfred was able to defeat the invading Danes at the Battle of Ethandun with the aid of the Virgin Mary.

== Poetic structure ==
The poem consists of 2,684 lines of English verse. They are divided into stanzas, typically consisting of 4 to 6 lines each. The poem is based on the ballad stanza form, although the poem often departs significantly from it. Types of metrical feet are used more or less freely, although there is often basic repetition in a line. The rhyme scheme varies, often being ABCB or ABCCCB.

== Summary ==
Prefatory note

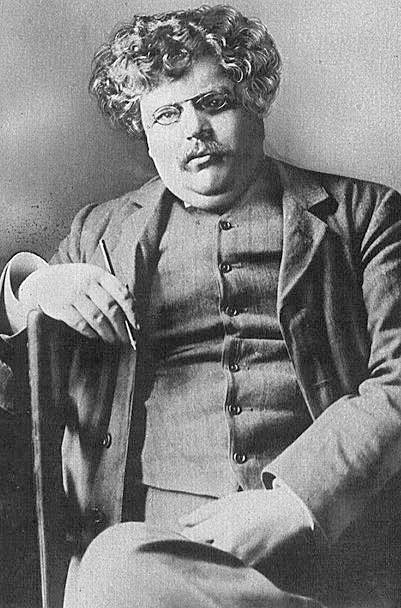
G. K. Chesterton, the poem's author.

Chesterton begins his work with a note (in prose) declaring that the poem is not historical. He says that he has chosen to place the site of the Battle of Ethandun in the Vale of the White Horse, despite the lack of concrete evidence for this placement (many scholars now believe it was probably fought at Edington, Wiltshire). He says that he has chosen to include legends about Alfred, even if they are historically unlikely.

Dedication

The poem opens with a verse dedication to Chesterton's wife, Frances. He begins by commenting on Alfred and his legacy, and he asks his wife to remember their travels together as they did research for the poem.

Book I: The Vision of the King

The story begins with description of the White Horse of the White Horse Vale and how it has seen untold ages pass by. Among these periods was the fall of the Roman Empire and the barbarian invasions that followed. The Danes have invaded and nearly conquered England, and now drive the Wessex King Alfred into hiding on the river island of Athelney. While there, the Virgin Mary appears to Alfred and gives him words of consolation.

Book II: The Gathering of the Chiefs

Greatly encouraged by Mary's words, Alfred sets out to try to muster the remaining Christian chieftains and their followers. Alfred first convinces Eldred (a Saxon) to join his cause. He is then able to obtain the support of Mark (a Roman) and Colan (a Gael). He tells them to bring their troops to the river-hut by Egbert's stone.

Book III: The Harp of Alfred

Before travelling to the hut himself, Alfred decides to disguise himself as a minstrel to meet the Danish chieftains. Shouldering a harp, he is captured by the Danes near their camp and taken to their leader Guthrum, who asks him to sing. Around Guthrum are three Danish earls, Harold, Elf, and Ogier. None of the Danes realise the identity of the apparent peasant. After he sings tales from the history of Wessex, Guthrum and his earls all take a turn playing the harp. Each man expresses his own view of life and the world. Finally Alfred takes the harp himself and sings his own Christian view of life. Alfred leaves the camp amid the laughter of the Danes.

Book IV: The Woman in the Forest

Alfred travels to the river-hut and finds that the chieftains have not yet arrived. While waiting, an old woman offers to give Alfred one of the cakes she has been cooking if he will watch the fire for a time. While doing so, he pities the old woman and admires her for her persistence in a life of hardship. Alfred is jolted out of his daydreaming when the cakes fall and burn. The woman returns and strikes him on the cheek with a burned cake, leaving a scar. Astonished at first, Alfred laughs at his own foolishness and gives a speech about the dangers of pride to his now-gathered army. The army then begins marching toward the split road where the battle will be fought.

Book V: Ethandune – The First Stroke

The Saxon army causes many woodland animals to flee in panic, alerting Guthrum to the presence of the Saxon troops. Alfred and his army begin to fear the coming engagement. Alfred admits to several grave sins, including sacrilege and adultery. He asks the soldiers to pray for his soul. The three chieftains each declare the way in which they wish to be buried. They then reach the battlefield and deploy. Alfred and his chieftains are in front of the Saxon army, and the Danish earls are in front of the Danes. Guthrum rides on horseback towards the back of his army. Before the engagements begins, Harold shoots an arrow at Colan. Colan evades it, and hurls his sword at Harold. The sword hits its mark, and Harold drops down dead. Alfred then gives his own sword to Colan, praising him for his heroism. Alfred takes a battle-axe for himself. The two sides then crash together and the battle begins.

A proud man was the Roman,
His speech a single one,
But his eyes were like an eagle's eyes,
That is staring at the sun.
"Dig for me where I die," he said,
"If first or last I fall –
Dead on the fell at the first charge,
Or dead by Wantage wall;
Lift not my head from bloody ground,
Bear not my body home,
For all the earth is Roman earth,
And I shall die in Rome."

Book VI: Ethandune – The Slaying of the Chiefs

Eldred quickly proves skilled at battle, and cuts down countless Danes. His sword suddenly breaks, and he is stabbed with seven spears. Elf recovers his spear, which proves to be a magic weapon he obtained from the water-maids of the English Channel. The Christian soldiers under Mark are filled with fear and begin to fall back. Mark rallies his men and charges at Elf, who dies by Mark's sword. The Christian troops are filled with confidence and begin the attack once more. Ogier encounters Mark, but the Dane is easily repulsed by the Roman. Ogier lifts his shield over himself, but Mark jumps on top, pinning Ogier down. Ogier manages to get an arm free and stabs Mark, who dies as he falls off the shield. Ogier leaps up, hurls his shield away and gives a raging battle speech to the Danes.

The Danes manage to push the Christian army back against the split in the road. The army is split in two down each fork of the road, with Alfred and Colan separated. Colan is then killed.

Book VII: Ethandune – The Last Charge

Chesterton takes us away from the battle, and brings us to the White Horse Down. There a small child piles up stones over and over as they fall down each time. Chesterton draws a comparison between the child and Alfred. Back at the battle, the king gives a rousing battle-speech to restore the confidence of his men. Much to the shock of the Danes the enfeebled Christian line once again reforms and charges. They are quickly cut down, but the Christians continue to fight.

Suddenly, the Virgin Mary appears to Alfred when his army is on the brink of complete defeat. This vision encourages Alfred, and his line charges once again. This charge is quickly broken up, and Alfred is separated and surrounded by Danes. Ogier is among the Danes around Alfred, and Ogier hurls his spear at Alfred. The spear lodges in a tree, and Alfred brings down his axe upon Ogier, killing him. Alfred then leaps over Ogier's dead body and blows the battle sign with his horn.

This strikes fear into the Danes, who begin to fall back. Alfred leads the Christians in a mighty surge against the Danes. At this point the separated portion of his army returns, eager for victory. The Danes begin to retreat and flee. Amid his defeat, Guthrum undergoes a genuine conversion to Alfred's faith, and is baptised after the battle.

Book VIII: The Scouring of the Horse

After the battle, a period of peace comes to Wessex and its king. Alfred encourages learning and culture, and gives to the needy. He sends explorers out to other lands. He refrains from conquering other lands, because he feels that he is not worthy to govern anything beyond Wessex. The Saxon people scour the White Horse free of weeds, keeping it white and visible. After many years of this peace Alfred is told that the Danes, under a different leader, have invaded again. He simply prepares to fight once more, and summons his army. Alfred reveals that it is not so much the violent pagans that he fears, but rather the cultured, subversive pagans. As he says:

I have a vision, and I know
The heathen shall return.
They shall not come with warships,
They shall not waste with brands,
But books be all their eating,
And ink be on their hands.

Alfred and his army march to London, and attack the Danes once again.

== Influence on other works ==
Christopher Clausen has argued that The Ballad of the White Horse was a significant influence on J. R. R. Tolkien's The Lord of the Rings fantasy novel. He argues that the basic structure and themes of the Ballad were borrowed and incorporated into the Lord of the Rings. However, after Clausen's writing, it was revealed that Tolkien wrote disparagingly of parts of Chesterton's Ballad in his private letters. "The ending is absurd. The brilliant smash and glitter of the words and phrases (when they come off, and are not mere loud colours) cannot disguise the fact that G. K. C. knew nothing whatever about the 'North', heathen or Christian."

Robert E. Howard, the American author, poet and widely known pulp magazine "fictioneer", was much impressed by Chesterton's The Ballad of the White Horse. In a letter to his friend Tevis Clyde Smith, dated 6 August 1926 (when Howard was 20), he writes: "There is great poetry being written now. G. K. Chesterton, for instance." In another letter to Smith c. September 1927, after a trip to San Antonio from his home in tiny Cross Plains, Texas, he writes: "Several books I purchased on my trip, among them G. K. Chesterton's The Ballad of the White Horse. Ever read it? It's great. Listen:…", which he follows by quoting several stanzas. Howard uses select excerpts from Chesterton's poem to serve as epigraphs for chapter headings in some of his stories. He frequently numbers Chesterton among his favourite poets.

The novelette "Dragon Moon" by Henry Kuttner includes quotes from the poem.

A musical setting for baritone soloist, chorus and orchestra (using about 20 percent of the text) was composed by John Gardner in 1959.

== Translations ==
- Centro Cultural Borges published in 2011 first translated excerpts into Spanish.
- Balada o Bijelom Konju (in Croatian). Translated by Luko Paljetak. Zagreb: Obnova. 2023. ISBN 978-953-50861-0-9.
