= Luko Paljetak =

Croatian poet and writer

- Born: 19 August 1943; Dubrovnik, Independent State of Croatia
- Died: 12 May 2024 (aged 80); Dubrovnik, Croatia
- Education: Faculty of Philosophy, Zadar; Faculty of Philosophy, Zagreb
- Occupations: poet, writer, translator, comparatist, historian, director
- Spouse: Anamarija Paljetak
- Children: Nikola
- Writing career
- Language: Croatian
- Years active: 1968–2024
- Genres: poetry, prose, drama
- Notable awards: IBBY's Honour List; Order of Ante Starčević; Order of Danica Hrvatska; Vladimir Nazor Award

Luko Paljetak (19 August 1943 – 12 May 2024) was a Croatian poet, writer, literary translator, literary historian, theatre critic, puppet theatre director, known for his work about Dubrovnik, ludist poetry and literary translations from various European languages. He was both member of the Croatian and Slovenian Academy of Sciences and Arts as well as Academie Européene L. da Vinci. He published more than 150 books, mostly poetry (around 40 books) and children's literature (poetry, plays), but also two novels, several radio plays, feuilletons, essays and theatrical reviews.

He was nominated for Hans Christian Andersen Award in 1997 and Astrid Lindgren Memorial Award in 2016. He was included in IBBY's Honour List in 2002.

== Biography ==
Born in Dubrovnik in 1943 to his father Niko and mother Marija Skvičalo, where he spent his childhood and attended elementary and secondary teacher's school as well as Pedagogical Academy. He graduated Croatian and English studies at the Faculty of Philosophy in Zadar in 1968. Paljetak earned his doctorate at the Faculty of Philosophy in Zagreb in 1992 with disertation Književno djelo Ante Cettinea ("Ante Cettineo literary work").

== Poetry ==
Due to prevalent ludism in his poetry, he was designated as "poeta ludens of the Croatian poetry". Paljetak is among the most productive contemporary Croatian poets.

== Translations ==
Paljetak translated from English (Blake, Chesterton, Dahl, Joyce, Walcott, Wilde), Spanish (Lorca, Neruda), French (Saint-Exupéry), Slovene (Prešern), Italian and Russian.

Most notable translations are those of the Joyce's Ulysses (1991), Shakespeare's sonnets (1984), The Canterbury Tales (1986) and "Anthology of the English romanticism poetry" (1996). Prior to his death, he translated Pearl (2022) and Chesterton's The Ballad of the White Horse (2023).

== Acknowledgements ==
Most notable accolades include:

- Ivana Brlić Mažuranić Award
- Slobodna Dalmacija's Annual arts award (1980, 1985)
- Župančičeva listina (1982), for translation of Prešern's poetry
- Croatian literary translators' society's award (1982, 1987)
- City of Dubrovnik Award (1983)
- Order of the Republic (1983), for translation of Prešern's poetry
- Vladimir Nazor Award (1986, 2005, 2012)
- Tin Ujević Award (1990)
- Goranov vijenac (1995)
- Dubrovnik-Neretva County's annual award (1995)
- Order of Danica Hrvatska with the face of Marko Marulić (1996)
- City of Dubrovnik Lifetime Achievement Award (2005)
- Dragutin Tadijanović HAZU Award (2009)
- Golden Charter of the Matica hrvatska (2015)
- Order of Ante Starčević (2018)
