= Whitehorse Hill =

Hill in Oxfordshire, England

- Site of Special Scientific Interest
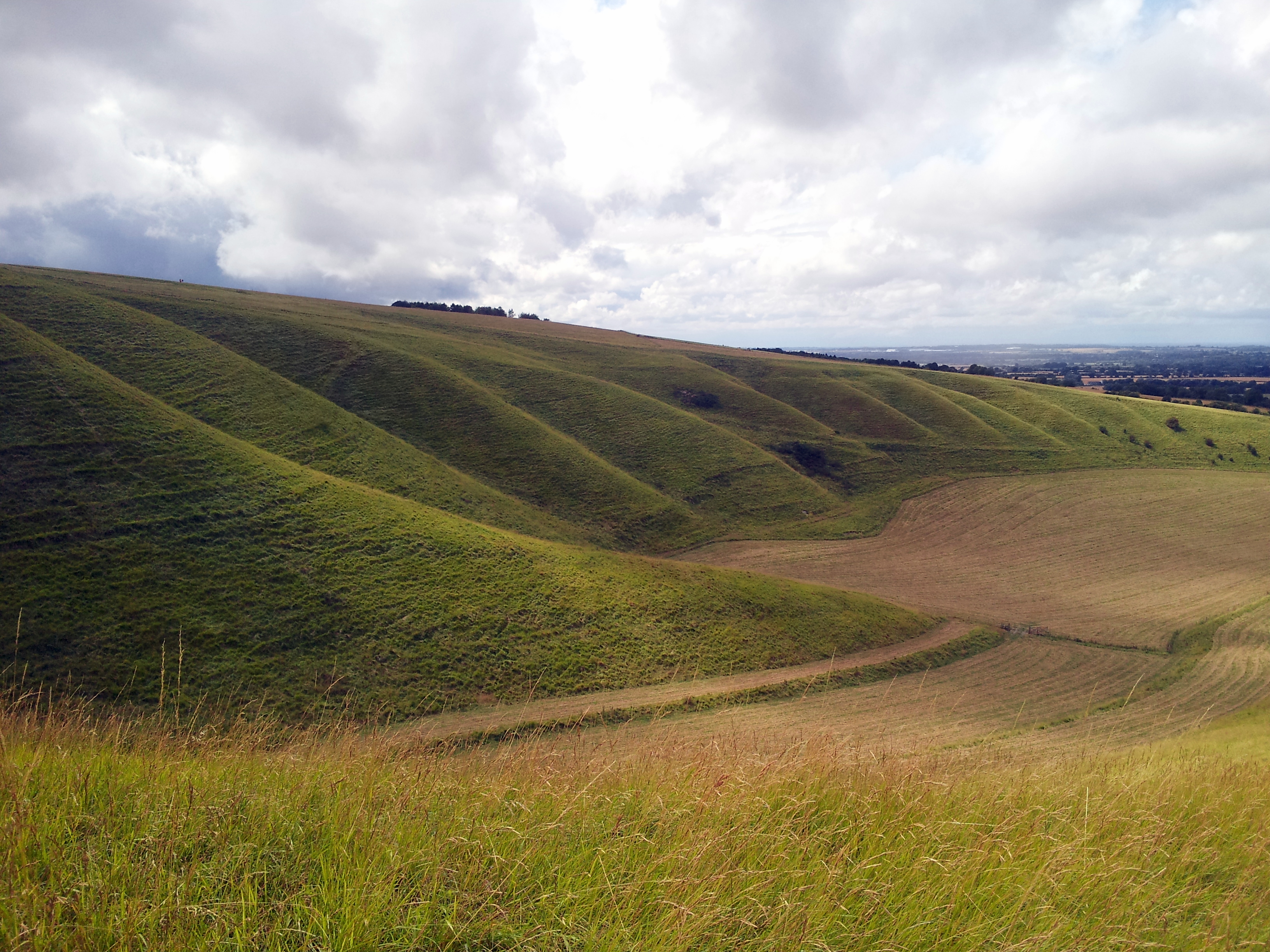
- Location of Whitehorse Hill.
- Area of search: Oxfordshire
- Grid reference: SU 300 867
- Coordinates: 51.578°N 1.568°W
- Interest: Biological; Geological
- Area: 98.9 hectares (244 acres)
- Notification date: 1986
- Location map: Magic Map

Whitehorse Hill is a hill in the Berkshire Downs in Oxfordshire, England, west of Wantage. At 261 metres (856 ft), it is the highest point in Oxfordshire. Uffington Castle lies on the summit of the hill, and the Uffington White Horse is on the hill's northern slope. The hill and an adjacent area below, including Dragon Hill and The Manger, make up a 98.9-hectare (244-acre) biological and geological Site of Special Scientific Interest.

The Manger, a dry valley below the hill, is a Geological Conservation Review site. It provides evidence of solifluction (slow slipping of soil downhill due to repeated freezing and thawing) during at least one cold stage of the Pleistocene.

The site has unimproved chalk grassland with a wide variety of flora, particularly in former chalk quarries. Grasses include upright brome and sheep's fescue.

The Ridgeway National Trail crosses the hill south of Uffington Castle.

== See also ==
- Vale of White Horse
