= Ryōma =

Ryōma is a Japanese given name. It can be written with several kanji, including 龍馬 (which directly translate to "dragon" and "horse")

The following people and fictional characters have the name Ryōma:

- Ryouma Baba (馬場 良馬, born 1984), Japanese actor
- Ryoma Hashimoto (橋本 竜馬, born 1988), Japanese basketball player
- Ryoma Kimata (木俣 椋真, born 2002), Japanese snowboarder
- Ryoma Matsuda (松田 遼馬, born 1994), Japanese baseball player
- Sakamoto Ryōma (坂本 龍馬, 1836–1867), late-Edo Era notable
- Ryoma Takeuchi (竹内 涼真, born 1993), Japanese actor, model and television personality
- Ryoma Tanaka (田中 龍馬, born 2001), Japanese judoka
- Ryoma Watanabe (渡邊 凌磨, born 1996), Japanese footballer
- Ryoma Yamamoto (山本 凌雅, born 1995), Japanese triple jumper

== Fictional characters ==
- Ryoma Echizen, main character of The Prince of Tennis
- Ryoma Nagare, first pilot of Getter Robo
- Ryoma, character in Power Stone
- Ryouma, the main character of Seijuu Sentai Gingaman
- Ryoma, character in Fire Emblem Fates
- Ryouma Kagawa, the main character of Tokkei Winspector
- Ryoma Sengoku, a New Generation Rider in Kamen Rider Gaim
- Ryouma Ichijou, the main character in Love Stage!!
- Ryoma Hoshi, a character in Danganronpa V3: Killing Harmony
- Ryoma Terasaka, a character in Assassination Classroom
- Ryoma, a character in Arena of Valor
