= Francis Wise =

Keeper of the archive at the University of Oxford

Francis Wise (3 June 1695 – 5 October 1767) was an academic, archivist, librarian and antiquarian at the University of Oxford.

== Life ==
Francis Wise was born in Oxford on 3 June 1695. His father, Francis Wise, was a mercer. After being educated at New College School he matriculated at the University of Oxford as a member of Trinity College in 1711. He became a fellow of the college in 1718 and was ordained deacon and priest in 1721. Within the university, he served as under-keeper of the Bodleian Library from 1719, trying but failing to become Bodley's Librarian in 1729 and President of Trinity College in 1731. He did, however, win the election for the position of Keeper of the Archives in 1726, in which he was the only Whig candidate. He carried out no new work with the archives, unlike his predecessors. His final success was to become the first librarian of the Radcliffe Library in 1748 – a sinecure post, since it was an institution that at the outset had "few books and even fewer readers".

His parish appointments were aided by Francis North, 1st Earl of Guilford, the father of one of his pupils: Wise became curate of Wroxton, Oxfordshire (1723), to which were later added the parish of Harlow, Essex (briefly, in 1726, before his election as Keeper of the Archives) and the parish of Elsfield near Oxford (1726 onwards). Trinity College appointed him rector of Rotherfield Greys in 1745, and he resigned his fellowship at this time. He improved the house and garden in Elsfield, and was visited there by the writer and lexicographer Samuel Johnson and the poet and critic Thomas Warton in 1754. Wise helped to ensure that Johnson was awarded an honorary degree by the university later that year.

Wise worked in areas including as numismatics and Anglo-Saxon studies, attempting the first scholarly edition of Asser's Life of Alfred the Great and endeavouring to sift the genuine medieval text from the later additions. He also worked with others on publishing an illustrated edition of the Junius manuscript, but the cost of production was prohibitive and the plan was not completed. He catalogued the coins in the Bodleian and left his own collection to the Radcliffe Library. He died on 5 October 1767 at Elsfield, where he was buried without a gravestone. A memorial was erected in the church 70 years later by Trinity College.

== Selected publications ==
- Francis Wise, Further Observations on the White Horse and other Antiquities in Berkshire (Oxford: Thomas Wood, 1742)
- Francis Wise, A history of English coinage to A.D. 1660, bibliography, and list of tradesmen's tokens (Oxford, Bodleian Library Manuscripts, 1750)
- Francis Wise, Nummorum antiquorum scriniis Bodleianis reconditorum catalogus (Sheldonian Theatre, 1750)
