= Dragon Hill, Uffington =

Hill near Uffington, Oxfordshire, England

Coordinates: 51.57927°N 1.56846°W

Dragon Hill
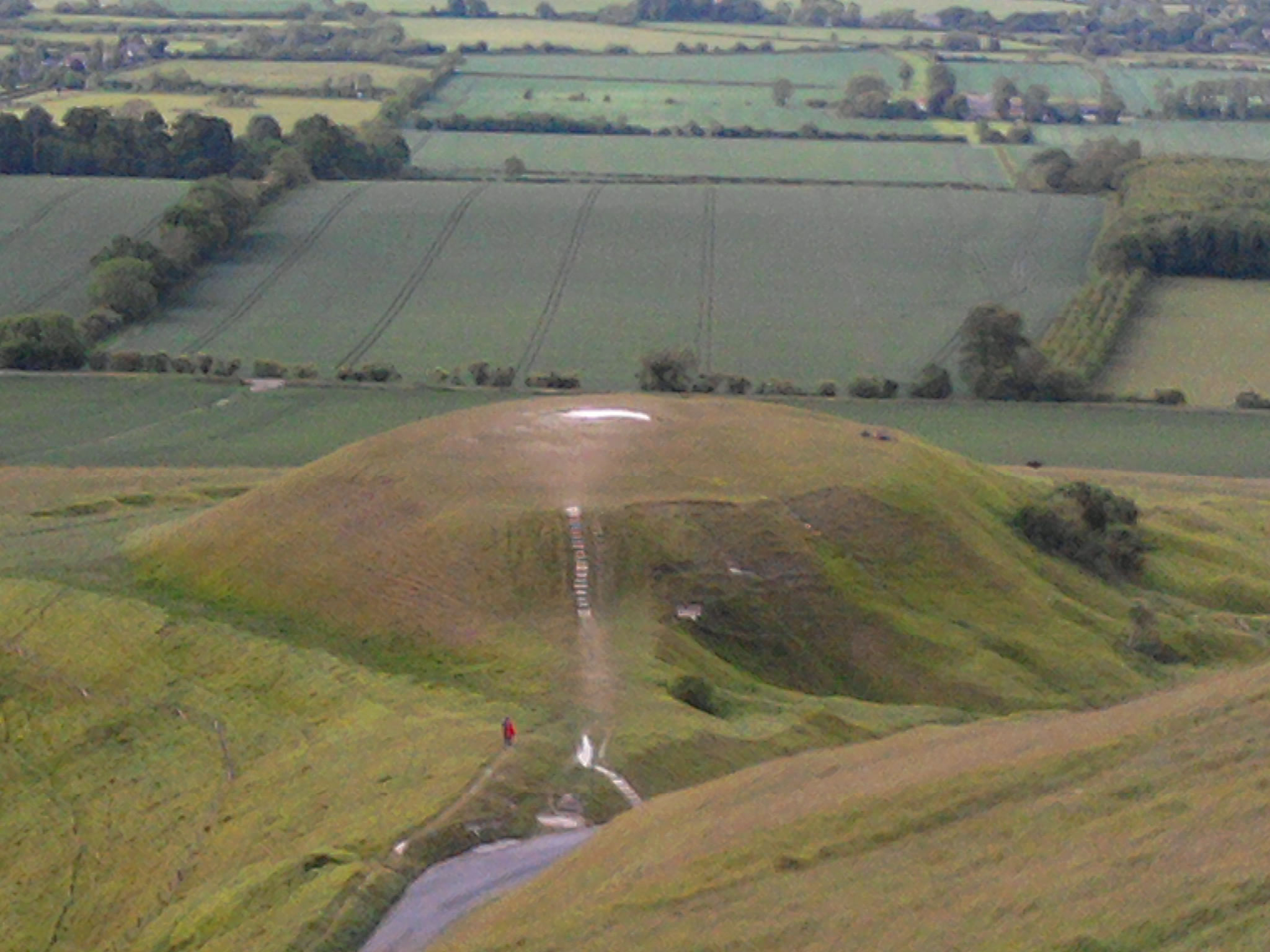
- Dragon Hill viewed from the White Horse Hill, Uffington

Highest point
- Elevation: 139 m (456 ft)

Geography
- Location: Oxfordshire, England
- OS grid: SU300868
- Topo map: OS Landranger 174

Dragon Hill is a small hillock immediately below the Uffington White Horse on the border of the civil parishes of Uffington and Woolstone in the English county of Oxfordshire. In 1974, it was transferred from Berkshire.

Dragon Hill is a natural chalk hill with an artificially flattened top (on the scarp slope of White Horse Hill). According to legend, Saint George slew the dragon here. A bare patch of chalk upon which no grass will grow is purported to be where the dragon's blood spilled. It has been suggested as some sort of Iron Age ritual site associated with the nearby hill figure.

It is part of the White Horse group of monuments in the care of the National Trust, and a Scheduled Monument in its own right.

== Influence and cultural references ==
The hill was used as the setting for the music video of the Kate Bush song "Cloudbusting".

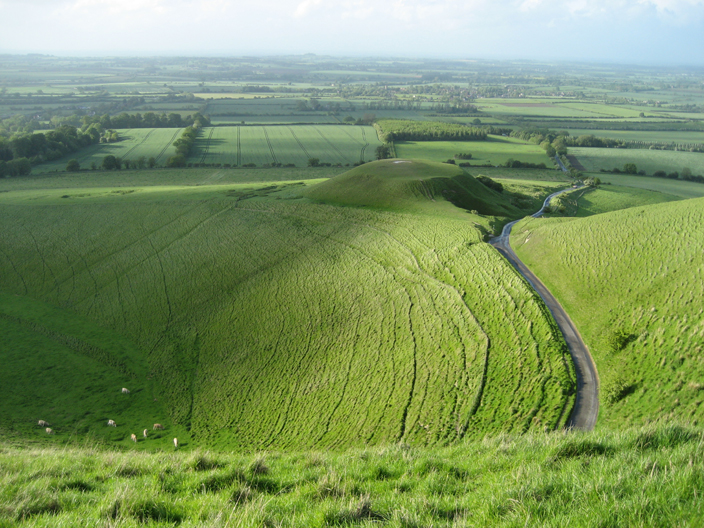
Looking downhill toward Dragon Hill and The Manger from just below the Uffington White Horse

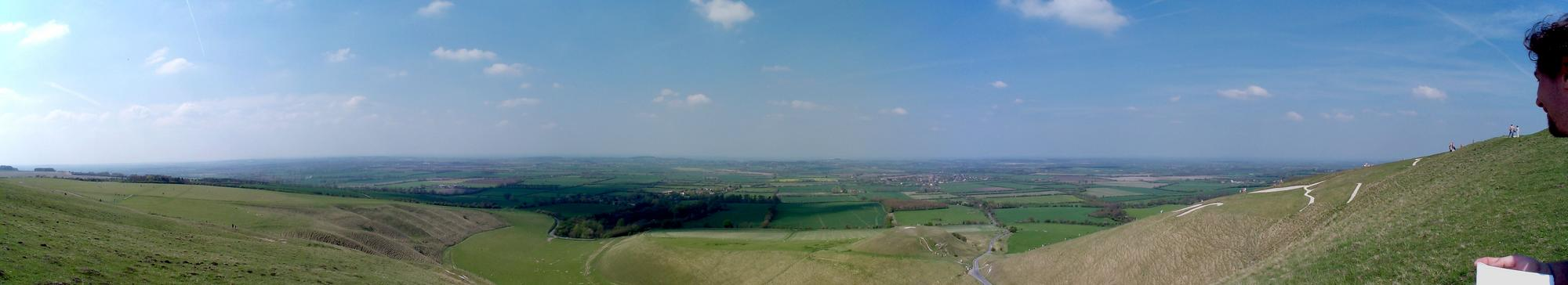
A panoramic view toward Dragon Hill (centre); the White Horse is on the right

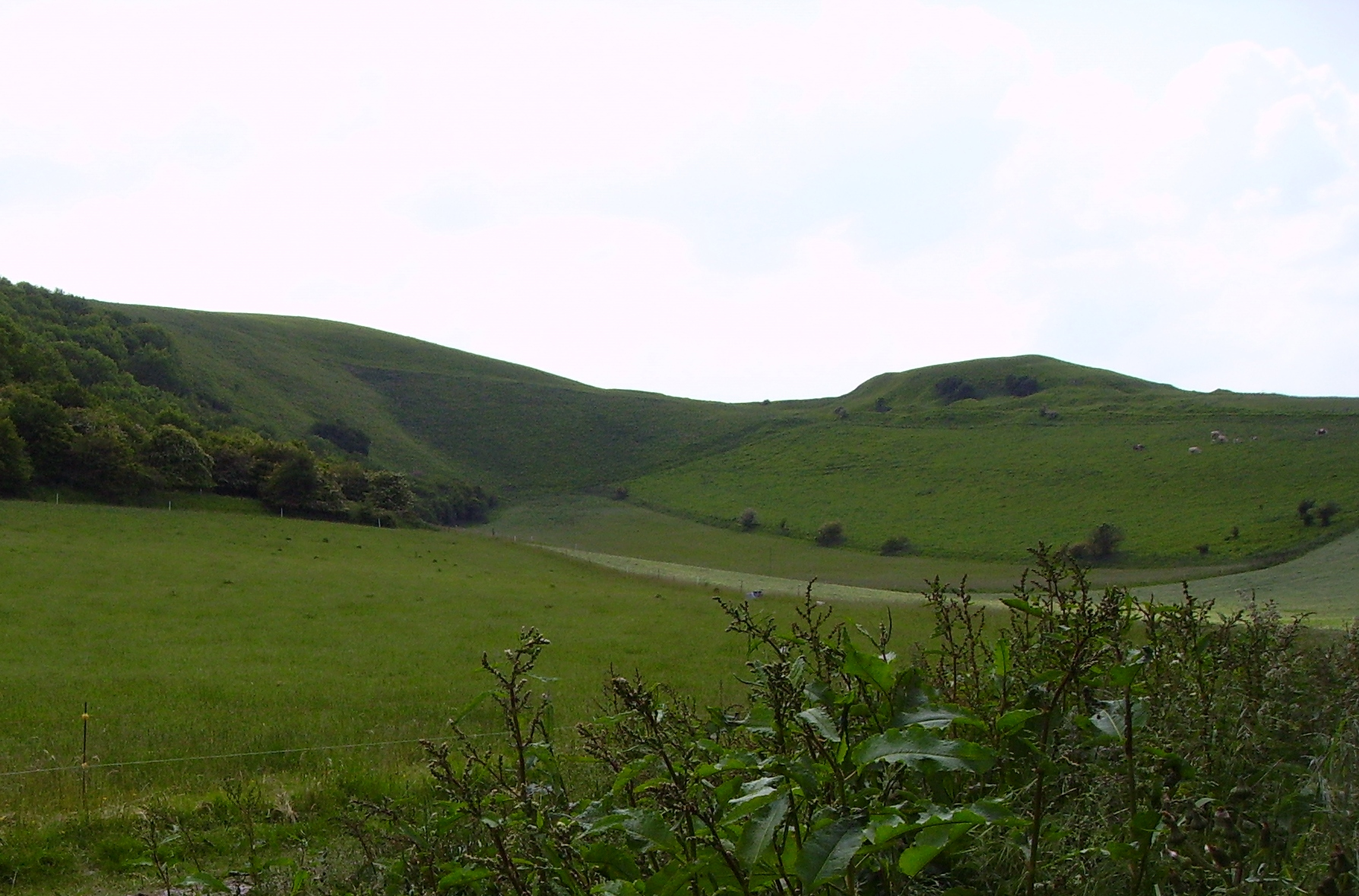
White Horse Hill and Dragon Hill (right)
