= Sarsen =

Type of sandstone block found in southern England

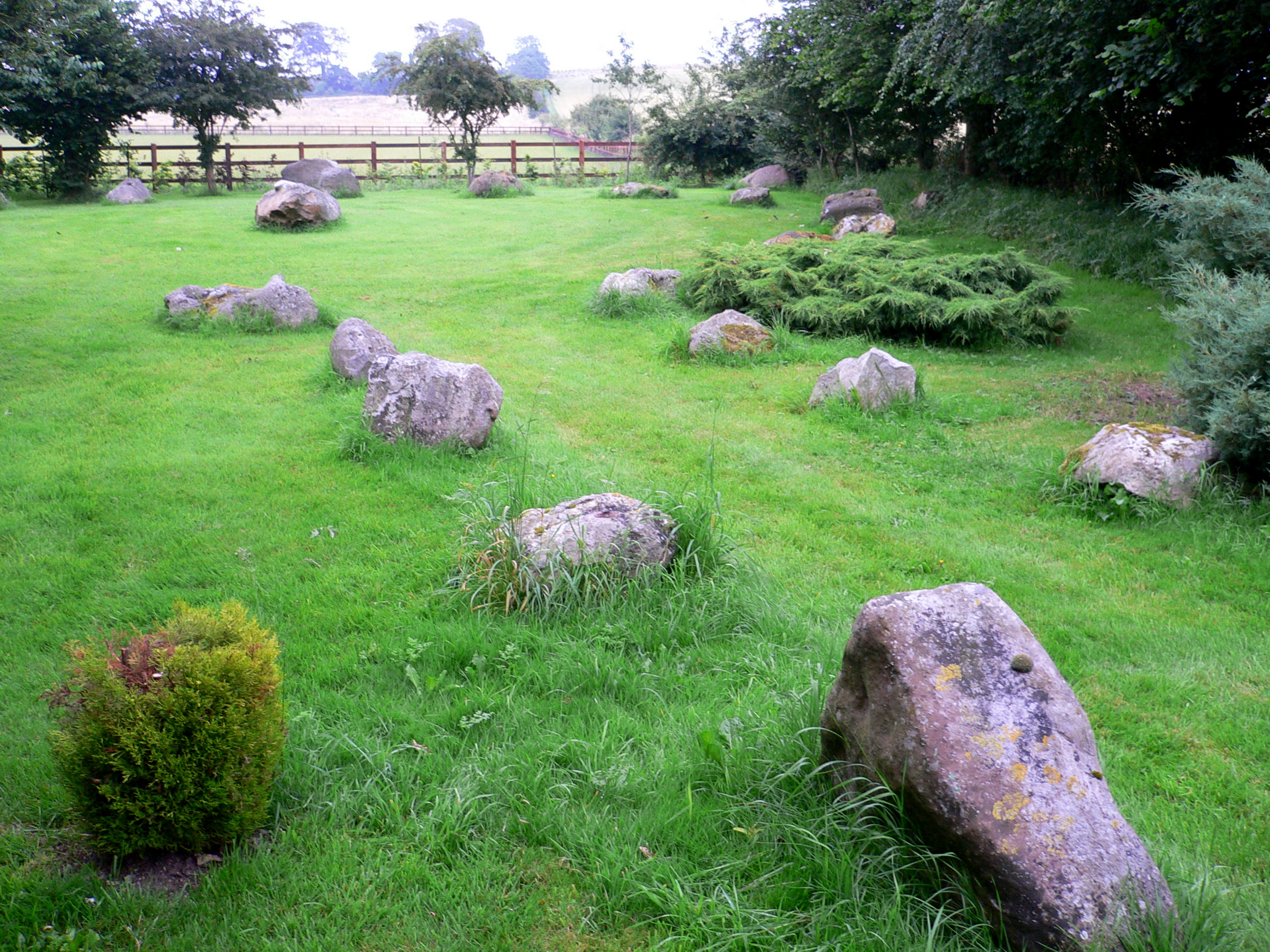
Sarsens in a garden in Wiltshire

Sarsen stones are silicified sandstone blocks found extensively across Southern England on the Salisbury Plain and the Marlborough Downs in Wiltshire; in Kent; and in smaller quantities in Berkshire, Essex, Oxfordshire, Dorset, and Hampshire.

== Geology ==
Sarsen stones are the post-glacial remains of a cap of Cenozoic silcrete that once covered much of southern England. This is thought to have formed during Neogene to Quaternary weathering by the silicification of Upper Paleocene Lambeth Group sediments, resulting from acid leaching.

== Etymology ==
There are several potential etymologies for the word "sarsen."

The first is that it is a shortening of "Saracen stone" that arose in the Wiltshire dialect. In the Middle Ages, "Saracen" was a common name for Muslims, and it came by extension to be used for anything Muslim or pagan in contrast to Christianity.

The second is that "sarsen" is a vernacular variation of the Indo-European term sasan, the name given to the prehistoric vaults of the Chota Nagpur Plateau of Northern India.

The third is that "sarsen" comes from the Old English compound sār-stan, "troublesome stone" (the first element is sār, "grievous," which evolved into Modern English sore).

== Human uses ==
The builders of Stonehenge used these stones for the Heel Stone and sarsen circle uprights. Avebury and many other megalithic monuments in Southern England are also built with sarsen stones.

While sarsen stones are not an ideal building material, fire and in later times explosives were sometimes employed to break the stones into pieces of a suitable size for use in construction. William Stukeley wrote that sarsen is "always moist and dewy in winter which proves damp and unwholesome, and rots the furniture." In the case of Avebury, the investors who backed a scheme to recycle the stone were bankrupted when the houses they built proved to be unsaleable and also prone to burning down. However, despite these problems, sarsen remained highly prized for its durability, being a favoured material for steps and kerb stones.

== See also ==
- Hertfordshire puddingstone – Conglomerate sedimentary rock
- Blowing Stone – Kingston Lisle – Sarsen stone in Kingston Lisle, Oxfordshire, England
- Wayland's Smithy – Neolithic long barrow and chamber tomb site in Oxfordshire, England
- Fyfield Down – Protected area on the Marlborough Downs in Wiltshire, England
- Coronation Stone, Kingston upon Thames – Stone in Kingston, United Kingdom
- Ashdown House, Oxfordshire – 17th-century country house in Ashbury, Oxfordshire, England
