= Yushu horse =

Native equine from Tibet

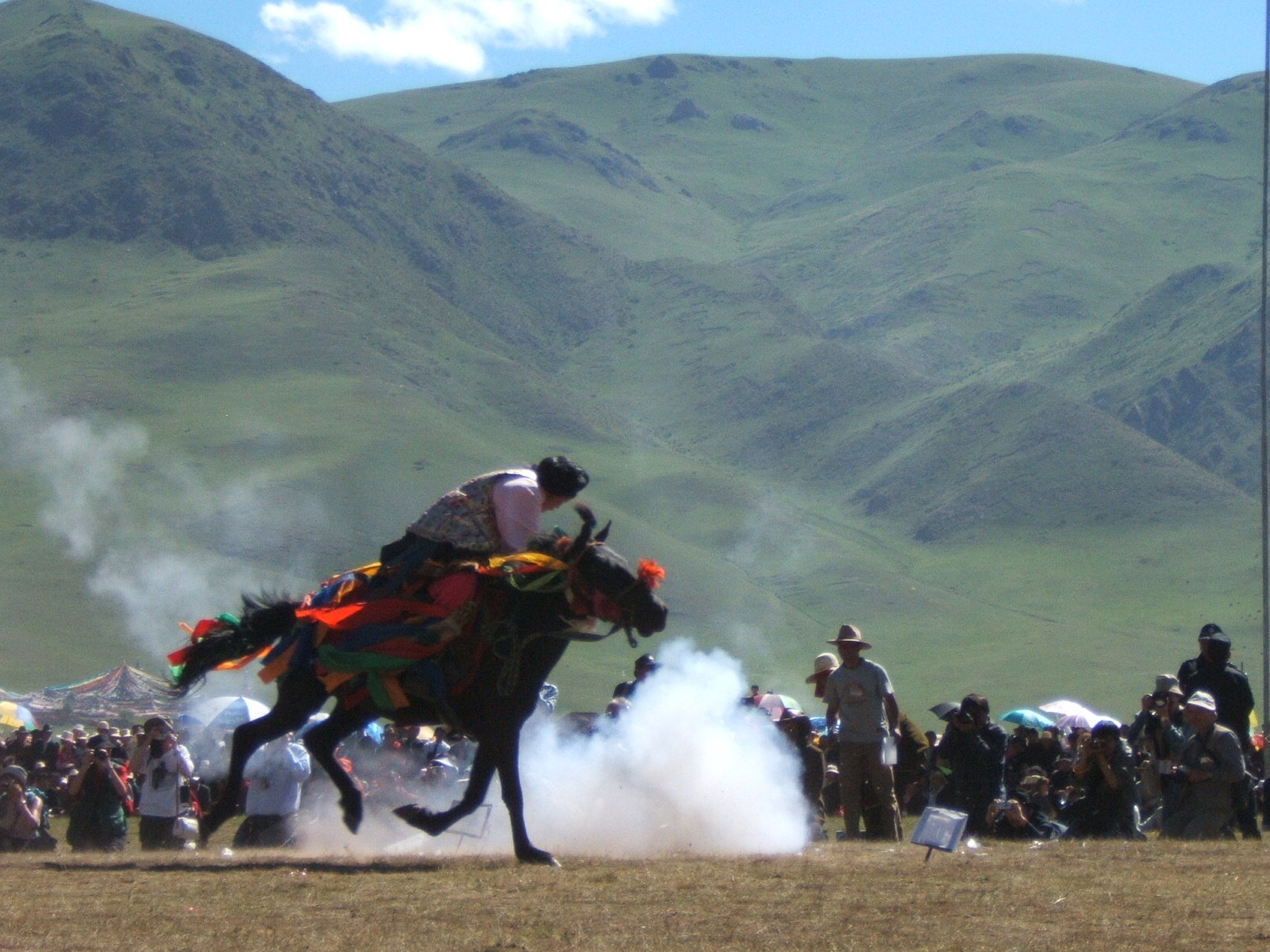
- Rider and his horse at Yushu Horse Festival, in July 2008
- Conservation status: Not endangered
- Country of origin: Tibet, China

Traits
- Height: 1.26 m to 1.31 m on average
- Color: Generally bay or gray, often with pangaré. Champagne gene possible

Yushu (simplified Chinese: 玉树马; traditional Chinese: 玉樹馬; pinyin: Yùshùmǎ, meaning "Yushu horse") is a horse breed originating from the Tibetan autonomous prefecture of Yushu in Tibet, administratively located in Qinghai, China. It is a local variety of the Tibetan pony. About its measurements, it is medium-sized and one of the few horse breeds that have the champagne gene. Its breeding was discouraged by Chinese authorities in the 1990s. Fit for the saddle, Yushu is adapted to its highland environment. It has been the subject of several studies on its genetic diversity and blood composition. The breed has become rare today, although it is not considered endangered by the Food and Agriculture Organization (FAO). It is honored every year at a major equestrian festival, which attracts thousands of spectators.

== History ==
The breed is also known as Gaoyuan, Geji and Gejhua.

The Yushu horse originated in the mountains of the region of the same name, and is known as a local horse. According to French ethnologist and explorer Michel Peissel, the breed received its name from the Chinese. The Beijing-based Ministry of Agriculture studied its qualities in the 1990s. Despite the relative enthusiasm of this report, particularly with regard to its meat production capacity, the Yushu breed is described as not being a desirable food source in modern China. The report states that Tibetans should be encouraged to stop breeding this horse breed in favor of the yak.

The Chinese authorities include in the Yushu breed the Nangchen horse described by Michel Peissel.

== Description ==
This is a local variety of the Tibetan pony. According to the FAO, the Yushu averages 1.26 m in height, with a small, narrow body. The Delachaux guide gives an average height of 1.30 m for females and 1.31 m for males. Adapted to its plateau environment, it can live up to 4,500 m in altitude. It is more commonly found at altitudes of between 3,000 and 4,000 m.

=== Morphology ===
They are generally smaller than the horses of northern Tibet. The head is fairly broad, with a straight profile, large eyes and short ears. The neck is carried rather low. The chest is large, the rump small, with a slight slope. Legs are solid, ending in stiff hooves. Mane and tail are well covered.

=== Coat ===
The coat is generally plain and the most common are bay, gray, and, the most frequent is pangaré. However, black, chestnut, sooty, buckskin and palomino are rarer.

The first Chinese study focused on the champagne gene, a particularly rare coat gene, was carried out on Yushu and Debao horses in 2013. This gene produces hazel eyes and marbled skin. The haplotype diversity of Yushu horses carrying the champagne gene is low. The presence of a mutation at the origin of this coat gene has been demonstrated, but the cause of this mutation remains unknown.

=== Genetic diversity and affiliation ===
Genetic studies have determined that this breed belongs to the Qinghai and Tibetan Plateau horse group, of which the Yushu is a member along with the Hequ, Datong and Chaidamu. In particular, it has an allele known as ‘T’, present only in the Hequ, Chakouyi, Datong and Yanji breeds.

The breed has undergone several blood tests: one in 1996, one in 2000 and another in 2008. The analysis of serum esterase polymorphism showed five different esterase phenotypes controlled by three alleles. A further genetic analysis showed that this breed does not possess the B haplotype typical of southern Chinese horse breeds. The genetic diversity of the Yushu was compared with that of the Guoxia pony, revealing that it is poorer than in the latter (haplotype diversity at 0.4190 for the Guoxia, compared with 0.2228 for the Yushu). As a result, the breed suffers from consanguinity.

== Usage ==
The DAD-IS database does not indicate the usual usage of this breed of horse. However, the breed is described as suitable for riding, with excellent ability to move at altitude, including over marshy ground, meadows or rocky terrain. It is probably used for pack and transport.

The horse is honored during the annual Yushu Horse Festival, one of the largest in Tibet, which combines racing, dancing and mounted archery. The festival was canceled in 2010 and for several years afterwards due to the consequences of the 2010 earthquake, but has since resumed. The 2016 festival, held in February, attracted tens of thousands of spectators.

== Breeding distribution ==
The breed is unique to the Tibetan autonomous prefecture of Yushu, administratively in Qinghai province. In 1980, 60 000 Yushu horses were registered with the FAO. By 2005, 35 100 Yushu horses had been registered.

In 2014, a study of livestock farming in the region recorded 3 260 people, 34 407 yaks, 11 557 Tibetan sheep and just 522 horses, meaning that horses now account for just 1.12 % of livestock. The increasing sedentarization of Tibetan nomads in the Yushu region is also a factor. In 2007 it was listed by the FAO as 'not at risk'.

== See also ==
- Horses in Chinese culture
- Chaidamu horse

== Bibliography ==
- Porter, Valerie (2002). Mason's World Dictionary of Livestock Breeds, Types and Varieties (5th ed.). CAB International. ISBN 0-85199-430-X.
- Rousseau, Élise (2014). Tous les chevaux du monde (in French). Delachaux et Niestlé. ISBN 978-2-603-01865-1.
- Yushu, Chi (2005). 玉树藏族自治州志编纂委员会 (in Chinese). Vol. 1. Shaanxi Press.
