= Datong horse =

Chinese pony breed

- Country of origin: Qinghai, China
- Use: Saddle horse and farm work

Traits
- Weight: 271–321 kg
- Height: 1.24–1.35 m
- Color: Bay, chestnut, black, sometimes grey

The Datong (simplified Chinese: 大通马; traditional Chinese: 大通馬; pinyin: Dàtōng mǎ) is a Chinese breed of small horse or pony native to northern Qinghai. It is a sturdy pony, well adapted to life at high altitudes. As with several other Chinese horse breeds, the population is in decline.

== History ==
The breed originated in a high-altitude biotope, at around 2,400 m, around the Datong drainage basin in northern Qinghai. In the 19th century, Hequ horses were imported from southern Qinghai to northern Qinghai, to be crossed with the Datong to improve it. This increased the size of the breed. From 1934 onwards, some Datongs were crossed to produce the Shandan breed. The Food and Agriculture Organization (FAO) lists 60,000 Datong animals in 1980.

== Description ==
The FAO gives an average of 1.26 m for females and 1.31 m for males, with average weights of 271 and 321 kg respectively. The average birth weight of females is 38 kg.

There are two types, light and heavy. The light pony is a coarse, compact-looking pony, very strong and muscular. The back is long, but as a whole is harmonious. The head is heavy, of medium length, broad in the cheeks, with a straight or "rhinoceros" profile. The ears are of medium length, with open nostrils. The neck is short, thick and muscular, not very well connected to the withers, which are fairly flat. Chest deep, ribs well rounded, abdomen elongated. The rump is short and sloping. The medium-length legs are covered with feather along the entire length of the barrel. The joints and hooves are very strong. The hocks are slightly closed. The mane and tail are thick and abundant.

The light Datong has a drier head, longer limbs and a more refined muzzle than the heavy type, and is reputed to be strong and lively. The Datong's temperament is considered good. Trotters and gaited can be found in the breed. The Datong is also renowned for its exceptional endurance, particularly at high altitudes, up to 3,500 m.

The coat is bay, chestnut, black, or sometimes gray or, even more rarely, leopard complex. White markings are possible on the head and lower limbs.

Genetic studies have determined that this breed belongs to the Qinghai and Tibetan Plateau horse group, of which the Datong is a member along with the Hequ, Chaidamu and Yushu.

== Usage ==
The Datong is used for agricultural work, especially as a packhorse. It is also bred for meat.

== Spread of breeding ==
The Datong is one of China's native horse breeds, originating in northern Qinghai to be precise. In 2005, Datong ponies numbered between 20,000 and 23,024 head. According to the FAO's 2007 assessment, this horse was not threatened with extinction. The threat level is now (2019) indicated as unknown on DAD-IS.

== Bibliography ==
- Rousseau, Élise (2014). Tous les chevaux du monde (in French). Delachaux et Niestlé. ISBN 978-2-603-01865-1.
- Porter, Valerie (2002). "Datong". Mason's World Dictionary of Livestock Breeds, Types and Varieties. CABI. ISBN 085199430X.
- Porter, Valerie; Alderson, Lawrence; Hall, Stephen; Sponenberg, Dan (2016). Mason's World Encyclopedia of Livestock Breeds and Breeding (6th ed.). CAB International. p. 460. ISBN 978-1-84593-466-8.
