= Shandan horse =

Chinese horse breed

Shandan
- Country of origin: China
- Use: Saddle horse

Traits
- Height: From 1,35 to 1,42 m
- Color: Bay or chestnut

The Shandan (simplified Chinese: 山丹马; traditional Chinese: 山丹馬; pinyin: Shān dān mǎ) is a versatile horse breed originating from the unique Shandan stud farm, located in China's Qilian Mountains. This military stud has an ancient breeding tradition dating back to antiquity. The breed was created in the 1930s from numerous crosses between Chinese horses and the Russian Don horse. Long bred for military riding and pulling, it is now used for tourism.

The romanization of the Chinese name is variously spelled shandan, sandan and skandan.

== History ==
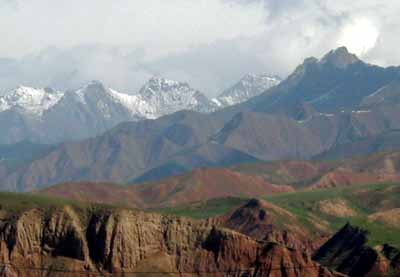
The Qilian Mountains, Shandan's birthplace.

The Shandan has the distinction of coming from a single stud farm of the same name, located at the foot of the Qilian Mountains (Qinghai region) at an average altitude of 3,100 m, with an average temperature of around 0°. The breed was once known as the "great camp horse", because during the Han dynasty, this region supplied a large number of military mounts. During the Ming dynasty, Gansu-wagashi, the "Temple of the Horse Garden", was founded here.

In 1934 the remnants of the old breeding establishments were put to good use to create the Shandan stud farm. Since then, local animals have been crossed with many other breeds, including the Yili, Chakouyi, Datong and Hequ, but the Shandan remains a small horse, never exceeding 1.15 m in height. So in the early 1950s, new crosses were made with the Russian Don horse. Each generation of horses was re-crossed with the Don to gain in size, but the animals' stamina was soon lost. In 1963, cross-breeding was resumed with stallions carefully selected from the local herd. In 1980, at the end of the crossbreeding program, the process was considered complete and the new breed was officially recognized.

It was also in 1980 that the Shandan was sent by the Chinese to Afghanistan for military purposes, to help the Taliban in their war against the Soviet Union.

== Description ==
Measuring 1.35–1.42 m on average, the Shandan is a small, harmonious horse with clean, lean legs. The head is light. The neck is sometimes common but well attached to the rest of the body. The trunk is solid, the rump broad. Natural stance is considered correct. Joints are solid and strong, and hooves are good. The breed has been performance-tested at altitudes ranging from 2,700 to 4,000 meters, demonstrating its ability to amble over rough terrain. The Shandan is also capable of pulling 89% of its weight.

The most common coat color is bay, although chestnut also exists. The breed's temperament is considered good.

The Shandan is bred extensively at high altitudes, with a popular transhumance system of seasonal grazing. They are simply provided with shelter in winter and supplementary oats in winter and spring. The Shandan is now kept free from cross-breeding, with improvements by selection carried out within the breed.

== Usage ==
The Shandan is both a saddle horse and a draft horse. Long used for military purposes, this use ceased in the 2000s. The horses were sold on a massive scale for tourism, the stud being gradually privatized to become a holiday camp for wealthy Chinese.

== Spread of breeding ==
This breed is considered common and a "developed breed", i.e. created in China from crossbreeding. Although listed among the 51 Chinese horse breeds in the FAO's DAD-IS database, no data on its numbers is available. According to the FAO's 2007 assessment, the level of threat to the breed is unknown.

== Bibliography ==
- Hendricks, Bonnie (2007). "Sandan". International Encyclopedia of Horse Breeds. University of Oklahoma Press. ISBN 978-0806138848.
- Porter, Valerie (2002). "Shandan". Mason's World Dictionary of Livestock Breeds, Types and Varieties. CABI. ISBN 085199430X.
- Zheng, Piliu (1984). Livestock Breeds of China. Food and Agriculture Organization. ISBN 9251021856.
