= Horses in Chinese culture =

Equine culture in China

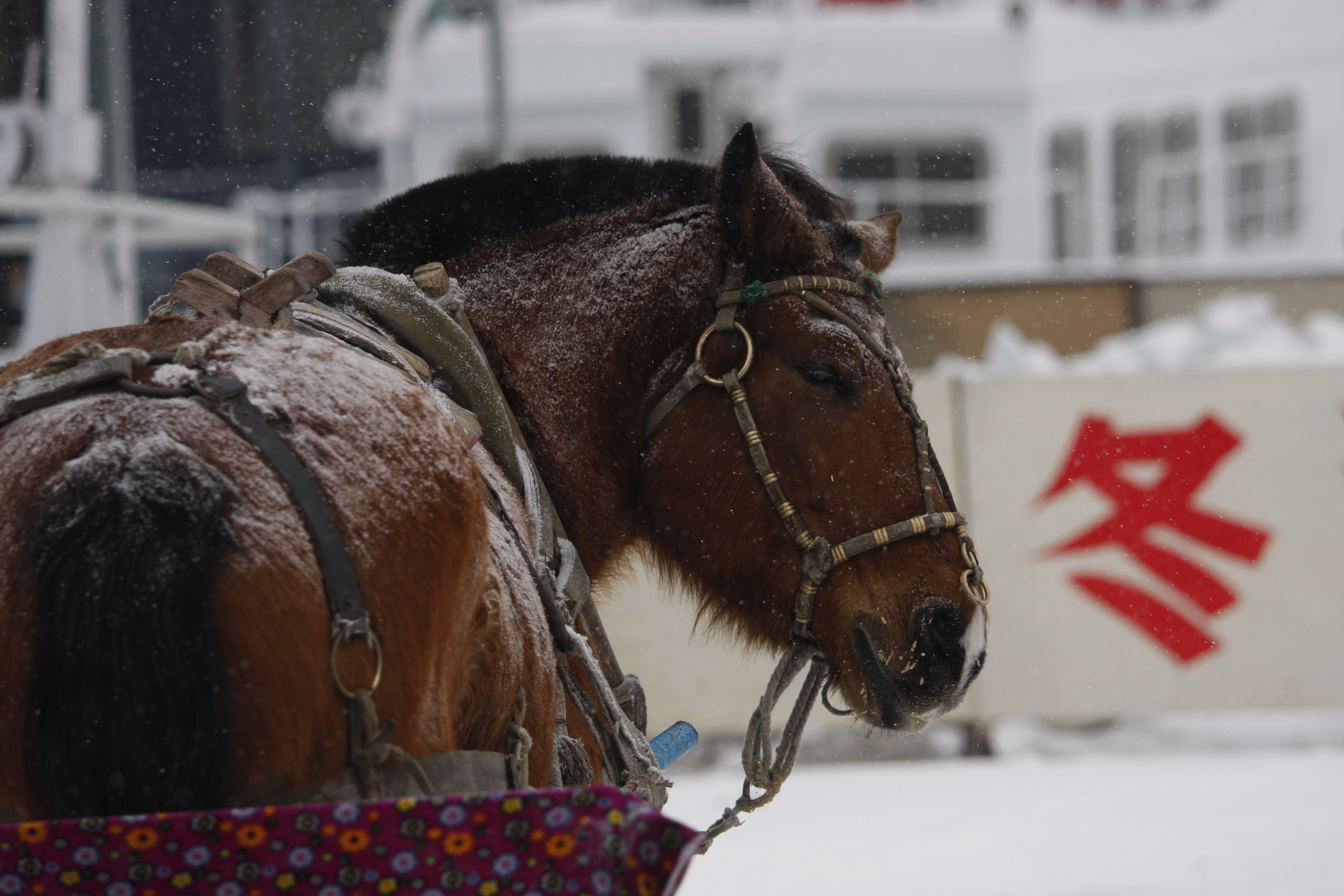
Horse-drawn carriage in Harbin

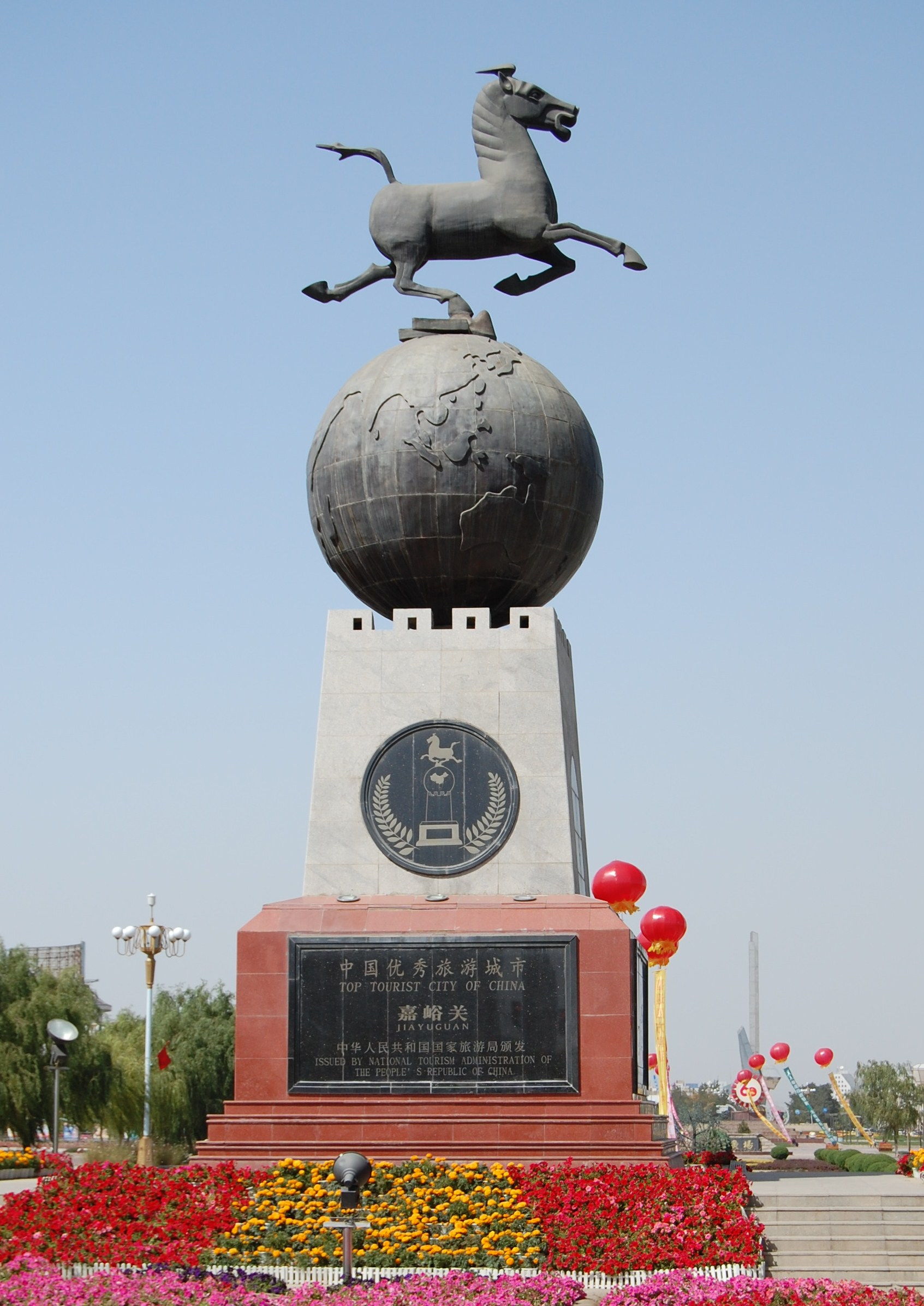
The Flying Horse of Gansu, emblem of tourism in China

In China, horses hold a significant presence, both in terms of physical populations and their representation in art and cultural beliefs, particularly in relation to astrology. In 1985, China had the largest horse population in the world, with approximately 11 million horses. The country is also recognized as the origin of the post-house system in Eurasia, which facilitated communication and transportation. Since the 2000s, the sport and leisure riding sectors have been developing in China, primarily catering to affluent individuals.

== History ==
A 2000-year-old tomb discovered in Xinjiang, northwest China, revealed the remains of two horses, one of which had a palomino coat.

Control of horses has historically been a key strategic issue in China, influencing diplomatic relations, military strategy, and the economy. For instance, the import of horses from Ferghana was aimed at securing the Silk Road.

=== Development of post houses ===
The Chinese are believed to have been the first to establish a system of post houses in antiquity, a development driven by the need for efficient communication within a vast empire supported by a strong administrative system. This system was later adopted by the Mongols during their invasions, illustrating its importance in facilitating rapid information transmission and military logistics.

=== 20th century ===
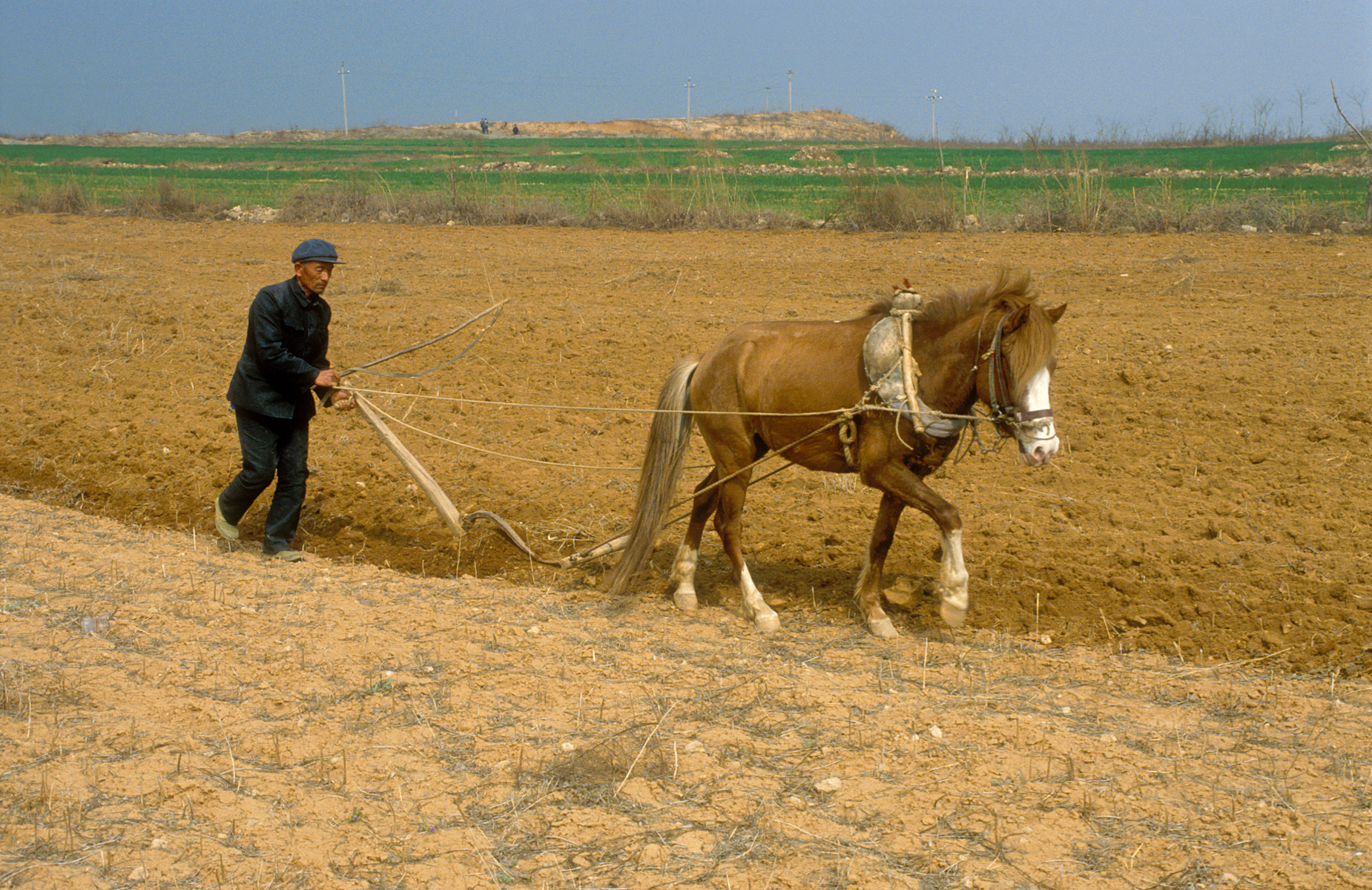
Farmer at work in northern China, 1991.

In 1949, the Chinese Communist Party banned horse betting, a law that remains in effect today, citing the practice as a result of the decadent influence of foreign occupation. Throughout the 20th century, China remained predominantly rural, with horses widely utilized in various aspects of daily life. By 1985, China possessed the largest horse herd in the world, numbering approximately 11 million, according to an FAO report, which represented one-sixth of the global horse population.

=== 21st century ===
Since the 2000s, horse riding has gained popularity in China, particularly among the more affluent segments of the population. In 2002, the China Equestrian Website was launched, cataloging equestrian clubs that reached 500 by 2012. The 2008 Summer Olympics in Beijing further accelerated interest in equestrian activities. In 2011, the city of Tianjin announced a $2 billion investment to develop a "horse city," featuring two racecourses, 4,000 stable spaces, a training center, and a veterinary clinic; however, the project's future remains uncertain. Many investors are hopeful for the liberalization of the horse betting market. Horse riding is increasingly viewed as an expensive leisure activity and a status symbol. Due to the smaller size of local breeds, many horses are imported, particularly polo ponies from Argentina and riding horses from France. Polo has become notably popular. In 2014, to celebrate the Year of the Horse and the fiftieth anniversary of Franco-Chinese friendship, the Nantes-based company La Machine created a large animated dragon horse and produced a show entitled L'esprit du cheval-dragon. On 20 June 2015, the first FEI-approved endurance race was held in China.

== Breeding and breeds ==
There is limited reliable information on horse breeding in China. Although several sources refer to a breed called the "Chinese pony," no such single breed exists. Instead, China is home to a diverse array of pony breeds and types, likely of Mongolian origin, which have been influenced by other breeds, notably Russian and European horses, through migration and military history. By convention, Chinese zootechnicians categorize horses into native Chinese breeds and "hybrid breeds," resulting from crossbreeding with foreign horses. Additionally, the concept of "introduced breeds" can also be applied. Five main types of horses are recognized:

- Mongolian type;
- South-Western (or Southern) pony;
- Hequ;
- Tibetan pony;
- Kazakh.

The number of distinct horse breeds in China exceeds thirty; however, only one is locally recognized as a pony, while the others are classified as small horses. The distribution of horse breeding in China is uneven, with breeding practices particularly concentrated in the north and west, encompassing areas from the vast plains at moderate altitudes to the mountainous regions of Inner Mongolia, Xinjiang, and the Tibetan Plateau. Horses are also relatively common in the northeast, but they are largely absent from the southeast, where the majority of China's urban population resides.

A book published by the FAO in 2003 mentions a breed of gaited horses called "Haomeng".

== Art ==
The presence of horses in Chinese art was particularly notable during the Tang dynasty, when many masterpieces prominently featured these animals. Noteworthy examples include the famous Flying Horse of Gansu and the Six Steeds of Zhao Mausoleum. The horse emerged as a distinct artistic subject early in Chinese history. A distinctive characteristic of Chinese art is the frequent depiction of horses in a natural state, reflecting a profound admiration for the horse as an entity in itself.

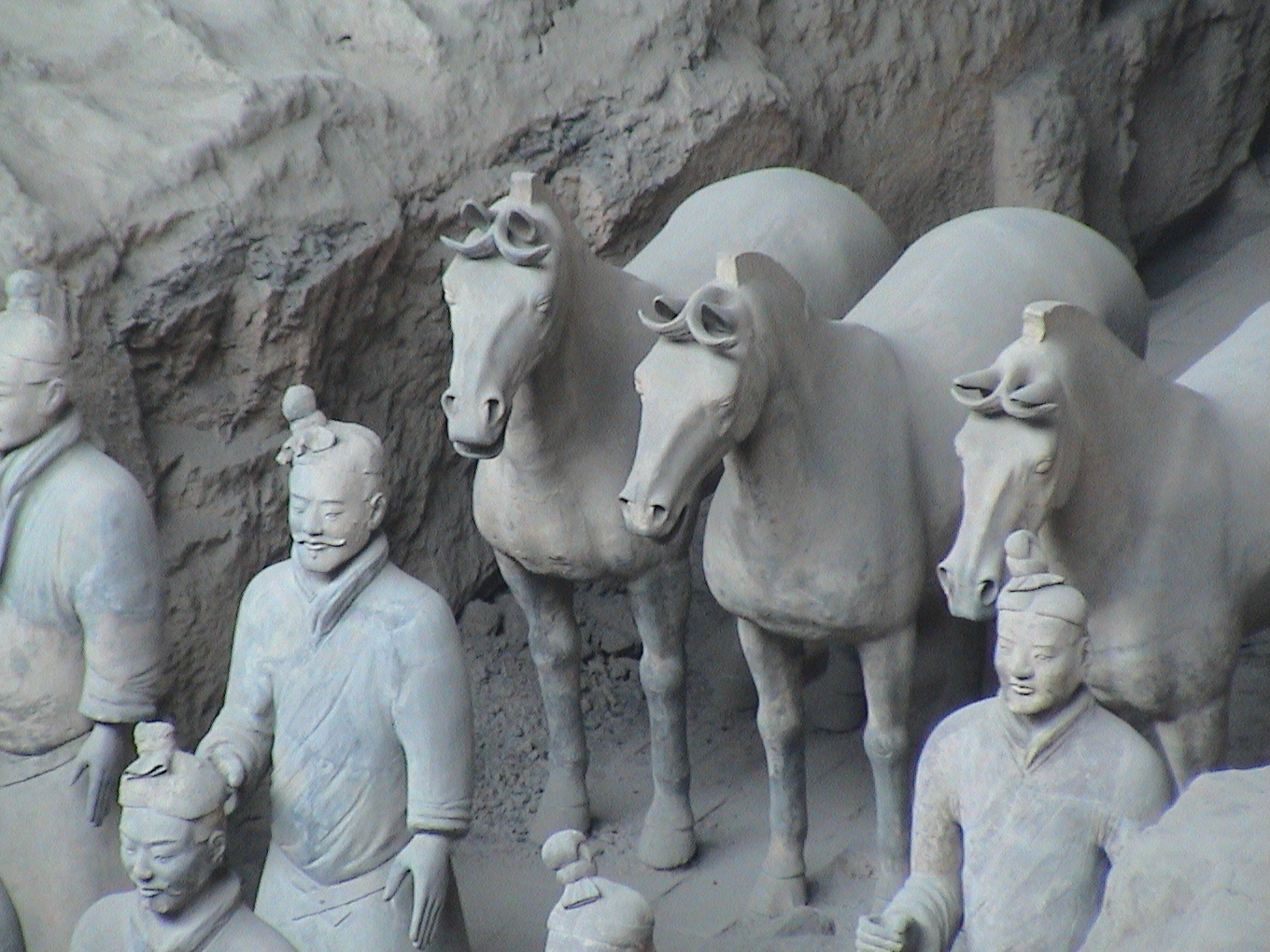
Three Terracotta Army horses

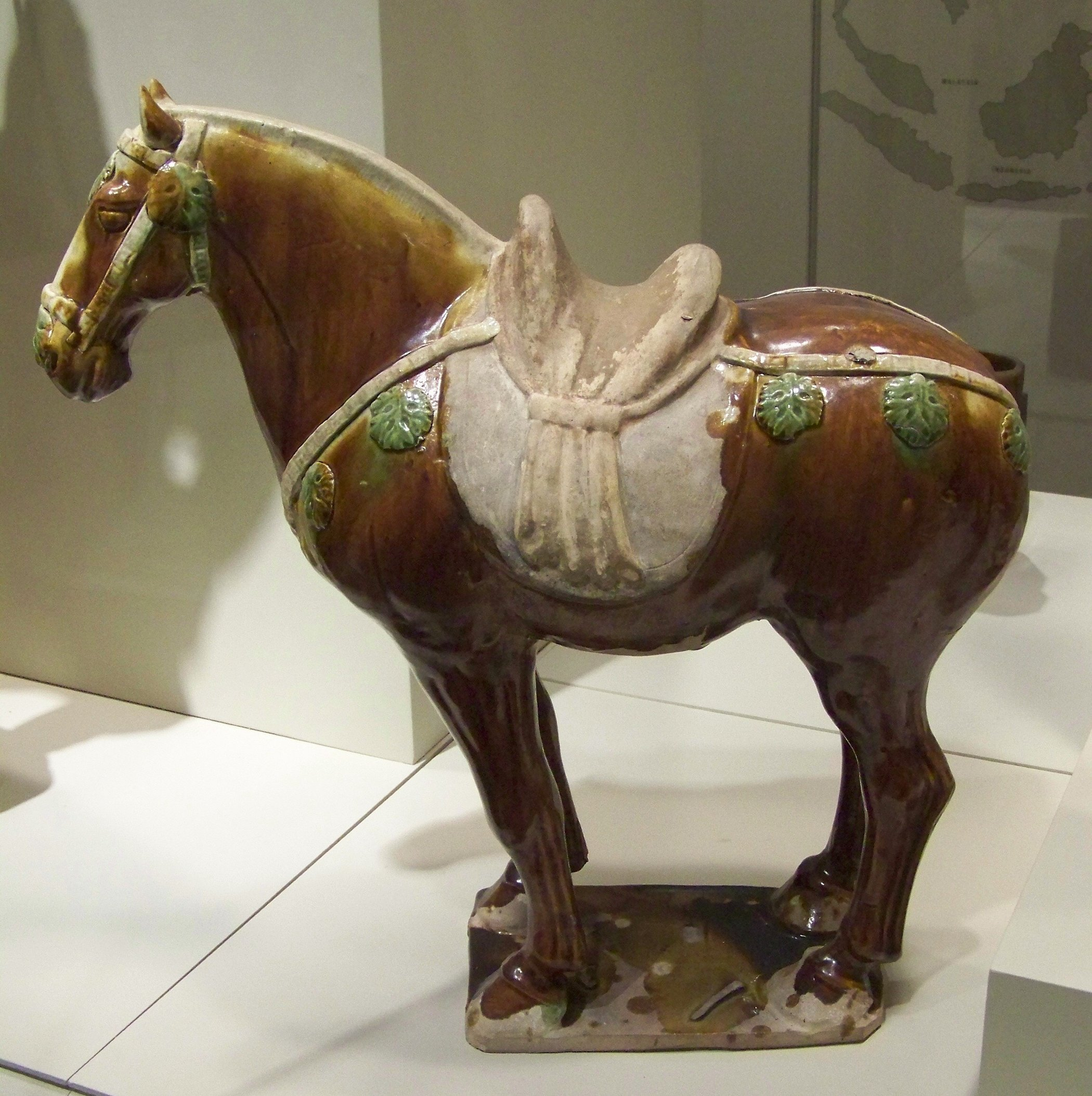
Tang dynasty horse statue

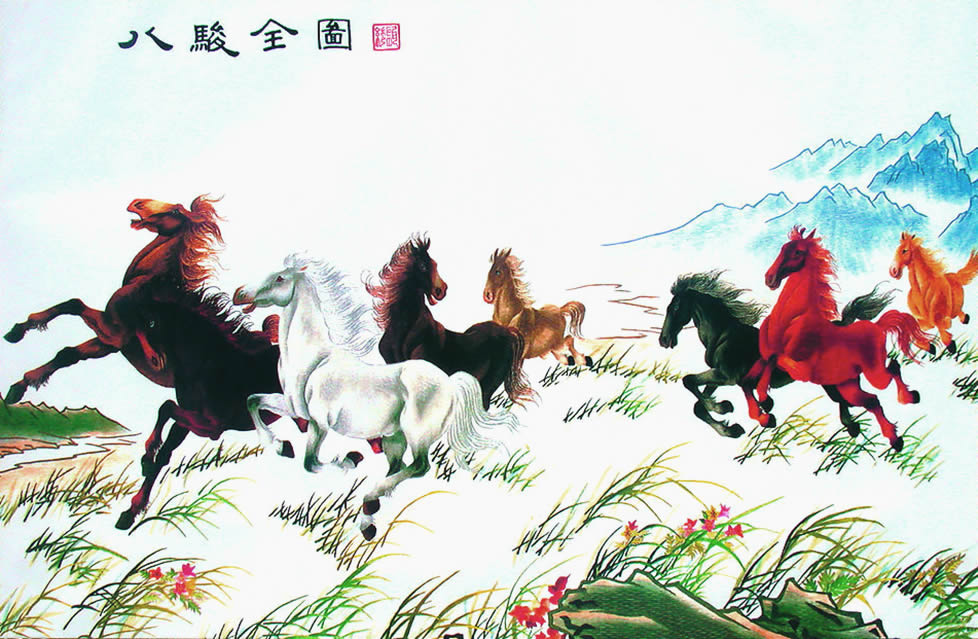
The eight horses, by Xu Beihong

== Beliefs ==
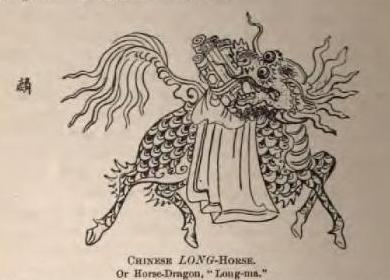
Chinese dragon-horse (longma).

While horses feature in various beliefs and traditions, they do not hold the same significance in Chinese culture as mythological animals such as cranes, phoenixes, dragons, and tigers. The association of the qilin with the unicorn—and by extension, the horse—remains a subject of debate. In general, the Chinese have primarily regarded the horse as a utilitarian animal, which accounts for the rarity of legends involving winged horses and the absence of a counterpart to the myth of the centaur. However, horses are included in the Chinese zodiac, where they hold cultural significance.

== See also ==
- Horses in ancient and Imperial China
- Flying Horse of Gansu
- Horse in Chinese zodiac
- Horses in Chinese mythology
- Longma (dragon-horse)
- Chinese Mongolian horse
- Abaga horse
- Chaidamu horse
- Ujumqin horse
- Shandan horse
- Chakouyi

== Bibliography ==
- Courtot-Thibault, Valérie (1989). Le petit livre du cheval en Chine. Caracole (in French). Favre. ISBN 978-2-8289-0331-2.
- Creel, H. G. (1965). "The Role of the Horse in Chinese History". The American Historical Review. 70 (3): 647–672. doi:10.2307/1845936. JSTOR 1845936.
- Fragner, Bert G. (2009). Horses in Asia. Austrian Academy of Sciences Press. ISBN 978-3700161035.
- Gazagnadou, Didier (2013). La poste à relais en Eurasie : La diffusion d'une technique d'information et de pouvoir Chine - Iran - Syrie - Italie (in French). éditions Kimé. ISBN 978-2-84174-614-9.
- Hendricks, Bonnie Lou (2007). "Chinese horses". International Encyclopedia of Horse Breeds. University of Oklahoma Press. ISBN 978-0806138848.
- Zheng, Piliu (1984). "Horses". Livestock Breeds of China. Food and Agriculture Organization. ISBN 9251021856.
