= Ujumqin horse =

Chinese horse breed description

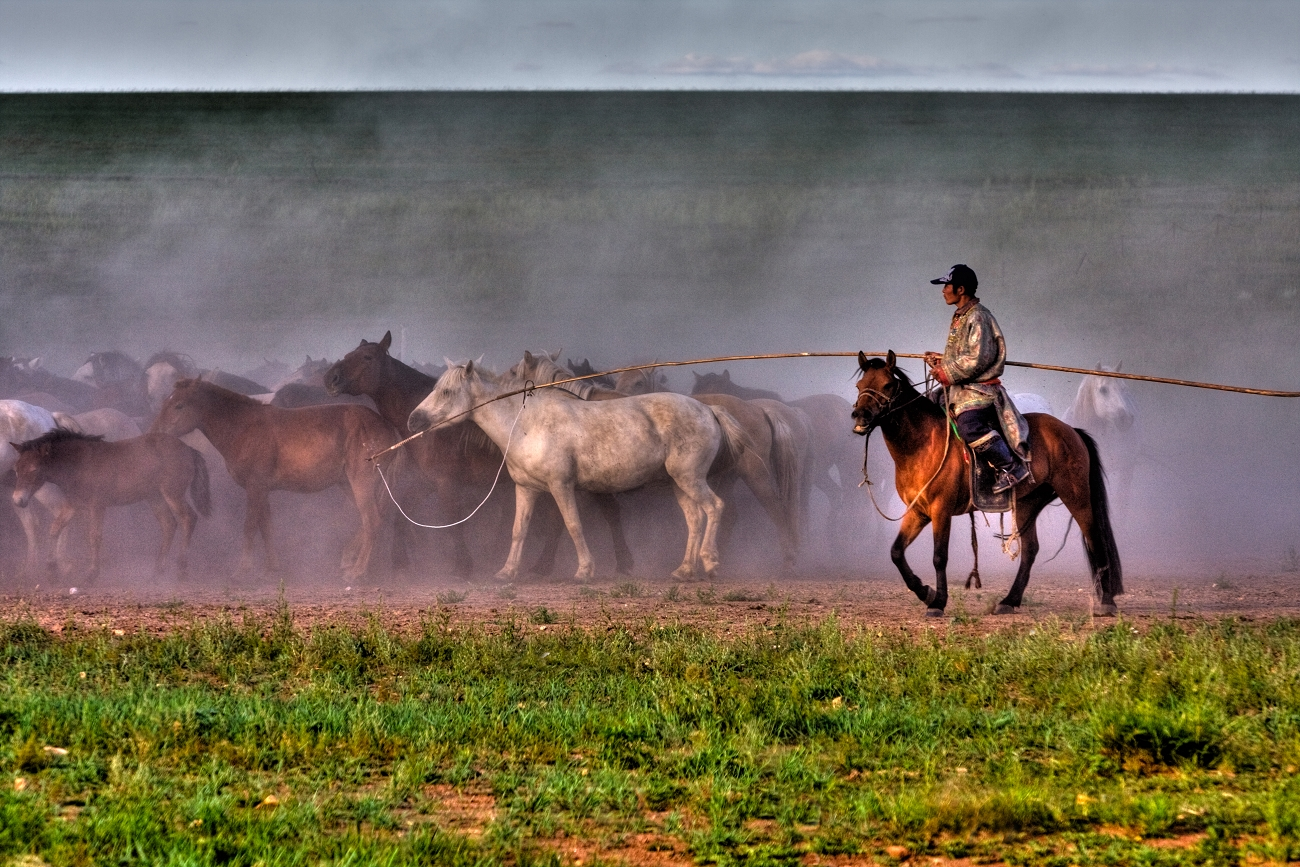
- Horserider in the east of the Ujumqin banner
- Country of origin: China
- Use: Saddle horse and mare milk

Traits
- Height: From 1.25 m to 1.35 m

The Ujumqin (simplified Chinese: 乌珠穆沁马; traditional Chinese: 烏珠穆沁馬; pinyin: Wū zhū mù qìn mǎ) is a type of Chinese Mongolian horse. Larger and reputedly better conformed than other horses of this breed, it is mainly ridden, the mares being milked for their milk.

== History ==
Also known as Wuchumutsin and Wuzhumuqin. The CAB International encyclopedia (2016) calls it "improved white Ujumqin". It is the result of selective breeding under human control, which has increased its size.

A technical communication from Commonwealth Agricultural Bureaux in 1969, followed by an official Chinese report in 1978, indicated the existence of these horses as a distinct breed or type. In 1982, around 100,000 Ujumqin-type horses were recorded in China, with a downward trend in numbers.

== Description ==
The Ujumqin is a light, steppe-type horse. It is considered an "improved", more elegant version of the classic Chinese Mongolian horse.

Different size data are available. In his 1984 study, Piliu Zheng mentions an average height of 1.35 m for males and 1.29 m for females. Caroline Puel (1989) cites an overall average of 1.35 m. CAB International (2016) indicates more than 1.30 m. The data are 1.27 m for females and 1.30 m for males according to the DAD-IS database, managed by the FAO. The University of Oklahoma study (2007) gives a lower overall average of around 1.25 m.

The Ujumqin is reputed to be better conformed than other strains of Chinese Mongolian, thanks to the quality of the grass in its native territory.

The breed has great endurance, and is faster than other Mongolian horses. Among the various types of Chinese Mongolian horse, the Ujumqin is the closest genetically to the Wushen, which is surprising given the great geographical distance between the two breeding areas. It is possible that this genetic proximity is the result of exchanges of breeding stock between breeders.

== Usage ==
The Ujumqin has a remarkable aptitude for work. The breed is mainly used as a saddle horse and transport horse. Ujumqin mares are milked for their milk: lactation lasts an average of 125 days, with an average yield of 350 kg per lactation.

== Breeding distribution ==
DAD-IS registers it as a local Chinese breed. It is mainly found in the Xilingol League in eastern Inner Mongolia, but has also spread to neighboring agricultural regions in northern China. No threat level is given. In 2007 the FAO listed it as 'not at risk'.

== See also ==
- List of horse breeds
- Horses in Chinese culture
- Shandan horse

== Bibliography ==
- Hendricks, Bonnie Lou (2007). "Chinese Mongolian". International Encyclopedia of Horse Breeds. University of Oklahoma Press. ISBN 978-0806138848.
- Li, Jinlian; Shi, Youfei; Fan, Caiyun; Manglai, Dugarjaviin (2008). mtDNA diversity and origin of Chinese Mongolian horses (PDF). Vol. 21. Asian-Aust. J. Anim. Sci.
- Mang, L. (2005). Wuzhumuqin horse-outstanding species on Xilingoluo grasslands. Vol. 1. China-Collection Industry.
- Porter, Valerie; Alderson, Lawrence; Hall, Stephen; Sponenberg, Dan (2016). "Chinese Mongolian". Mason's World Encyclopedia of Livestock Breeds and Breeding (6th ed.). CAB International. ISBN 978-1-84593-466-8.
- Puel, Caroline (1989). "Où sont donc passés les chevaux chinois ?". Le petit livre du cheval en Chine. Caracole (in French). Favre. ISBN 978-2828903312.
- Zheng, Piliu (1984). "Horses". Livestock Breeds of China. Food and Agriculture Organization. ISBN 9251021856.
