= Chaidamu horse =

Chinese horse breed description

- Country of origin: China, and Tibet
- Use: Horse-drawn vehicle

Traits
- Height: From 1,29 m to 1,31 m
- Color: Generally gray, rarely chestnut or black

The Chaidamu (simplified Chinese: 柴达木; traditional Chinese: 柴達木; pinyin: cháidámù) is a breed of horse native to Qinghai, Tibet and China. Closely related to the Mongolian horse, this working pony is mainly used for pulling. It has been in serious decline since the end of the 20th century, mainly due to the desertification of the Qaidam Basin.

== Description ==
Belongs to the Mongolian horse group. According to data supplied to the FAO, the average height of females is 1.29 m, that of males 1.31 m. It is a working pony. The head is short and broad, the body of moderate size and solid, rounded conformation. The legs are short.

The coat is plain, usually gray, more rarely chestnut or black. Chaidamu are well adapted to wetlands, and are considered productive up to the age of 16. Females have an average of 16 lactations in their lifetime.

It is not listed in the University of Oklahoma reference book. The CAB International reference simply lists it as a Chinese horse breed.

Genetic studies have determined that this breed belongs to the Qinghai and Tibetan Plateau horse group, of which the Chaidamu is a member along with the Hequ, Datong and Yushu. One study focused on Y chromosome variations, demonstrating that Chaidamu belongs to haplotype A, the most common in native Chinese horses. Another looked at its genetic diversity. Although this is quite good overall, with multiple maternal lines, it is one of the poorest of the 13 Chinese breeds studied. This is probably due to the decline of the breed as a result of the desertification of the Qaidam Basin.

== Usage ==
Mainly used for horse-drawn vehicles.

== Spread of breeding ==
The Chaidamu is found in Dulan xian, Golmud prefecture and Wulan xian, all in China's Qinghai. The Qaidam Basin is renowned for its sheep, yak and horse breeding.

The Chaidamu experienced a major population decline at the end of the 20th century. In 1978, around 50,000 of these horses were counted throughout China. In 2005, the number of Chaidamu was estimated at between 5,000 and 13,043 head, with a downward trend. The breed is considered threatened in China, but according to the FAO's 2007 assessment, the horse is not in danger of extinction.

== Bibliography ==
- 陈伟生; 徐桂芳 (2004). "Chaidamu". 中国家畜地方品种资源图谱 (in Chinese). 中国农业出版社.
