= Steppe horse =

Steppe horse may refer to:

- Chinese Mongolian horse
- Kalmyk horse
- Mongolian horse
- Przewalski's horse
