= Abaga horse =

Chinese horse breed

- Country of origin: China
- Use: Saddle horse, and mare milk

Traits
- Height: From 1.36 m to 1.40 m
- Color: Generally black

The Abaga (simplified Chinese: 阿巴嘎黑马; traditional Chinese: 阿巴嘎黑馬; pinyin: Abaga) is a type of Chinese Mongolian horse. Characterized by its generally black coat, it is also larger and faster than the latter, due to its selection for racing.

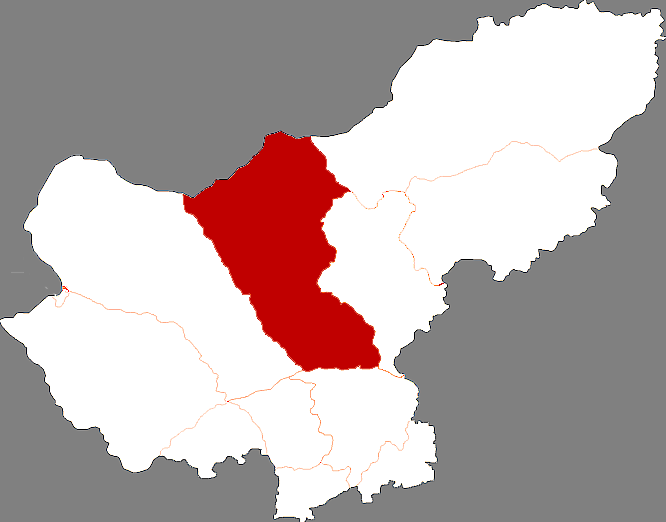
Location of Abag banner in the Xilingol League

The Abaga originates from the northern Abag Banner in the Xilingol League, Inner Mongolia. It is a rare breed overall, with 3,758 individuals recorded at the end of 2008.

== Characteristics ==
The Abaga is a typical steppe horse. According to the Delachaux guide, its average height is 1.36 m to 1.40 m.

The head is straight or slightly convex, with a broad forehead, large eyes and small ears. The neck is fairly long. The withers are rather flat. The chest is broad and the shoulders muscular. The back is fairly long, and the rump short, with a slight slope. Hooves are small and hard.

The coat is predominantly black, more rarely dark bay.

These horses are renowned for their stamina and good temperament. They are extremely hardy, enabling them to live outdoors, on high plateaus, all year round, at low temperatures, with little rainfall, and in a hypoxic environment.

== Breed history ==
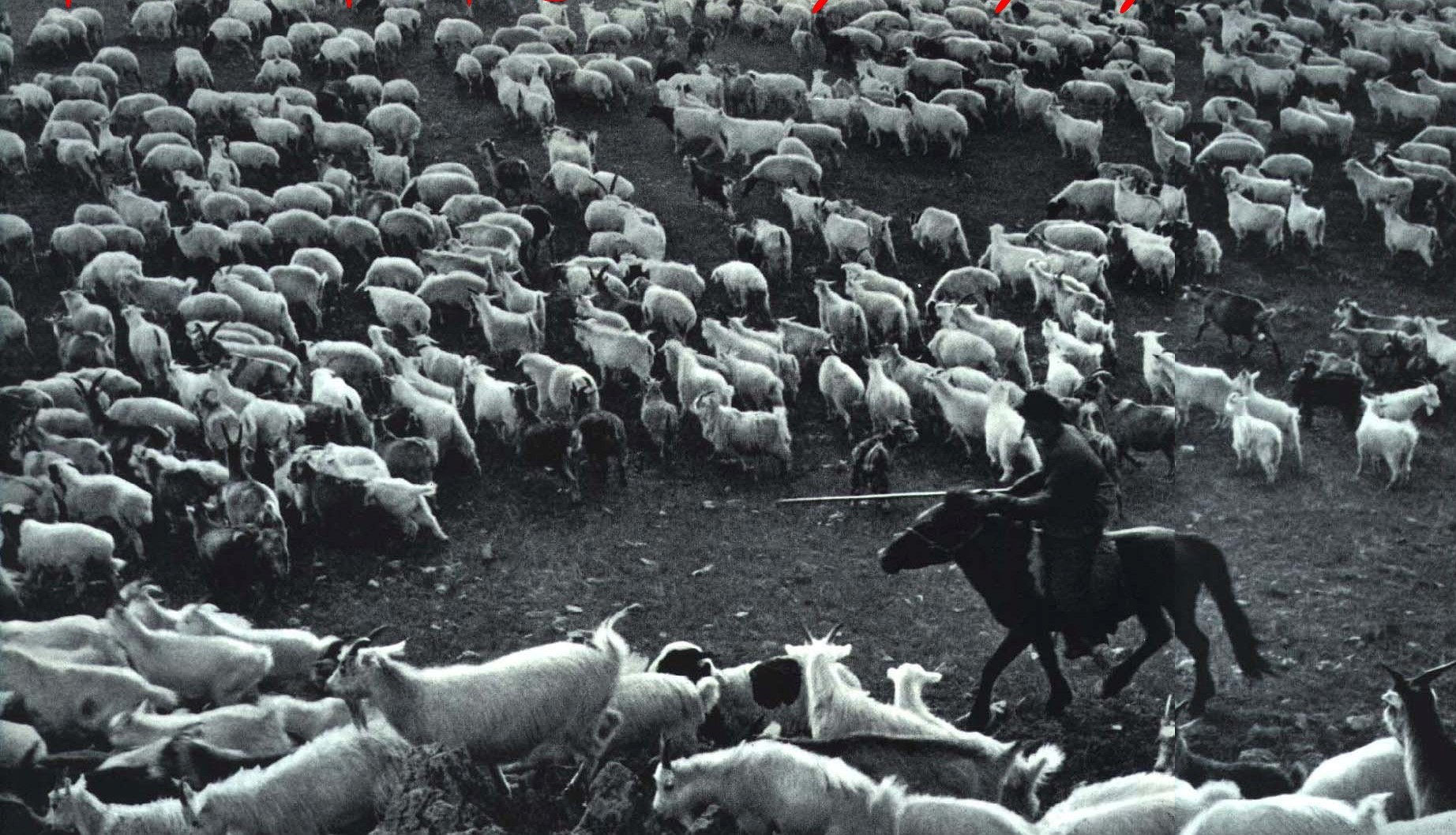
Shepherd on horseback in the Abag banner, 1964

The 2016 edition of the CAB International book refers to the breed as Black Abaga, while scientific publications refer to it as Abaga. According to the Delachaux guide (2014), it is also referred to as the "Sengseng black horse". However, the same publication also refers to the breed under the erroneous name of "Black Agaba".

Although ancient and the result of long selection, the Abaga was only officially characterized in 2009. Little is known about the different types of Mongolian horse, with research efforts focusing more on Thoroughbreds and Quarter Horses. Genetic research on this breed is motivated (2018) in particular by research into racing performance during the Naadam, in order to improve the speed of the different strains of Mongolian horses.

== Uses ==
The Abaga is primarily a racehorse, whose speed was measured over 1,600 meters by the Chinese Animal Genetic Resources Commission in 2011. It is notably faster than the Wushen, another type of Mongolian horse. It seems that this speed is the result of selective breeding, which favors certain characteristics such as heart and muscle development.

It could be used for pleasure riding, and is also bred for meat and mare milk.

== See also ==
- List of Chinese horse breeds
- Horses in Chinese culture
