= Horses in ancient and imperial China =

Horses in ancient and imperial China were an important element in Chinese society on cultural, military, and agricultural levels. Horses were introduced from the West, disrupting methods of warfare, and forcing local warring states to adopt new military practices such as using chariots (c. 1000 BC) and the cavalry. The strategic role of horses in large numbers for military defense against steppe invaders is well-documented.

The furthest Chinese conquests to the north and west were achieved under the Han, Tang, Ming and Qing dynasties thanks to extensive military-managed horse-farms, involving hundreds of thousands of horses. Horses were highly valued and prevalent until late in Qing dynasty period of 1644–1912.

Increased industrialization, increased use of mechanical labor, and China's century of humiliation (c. 1840 – c. 1950) led to the virtual disappearance of China's equine tradition.

== Ancient China ==
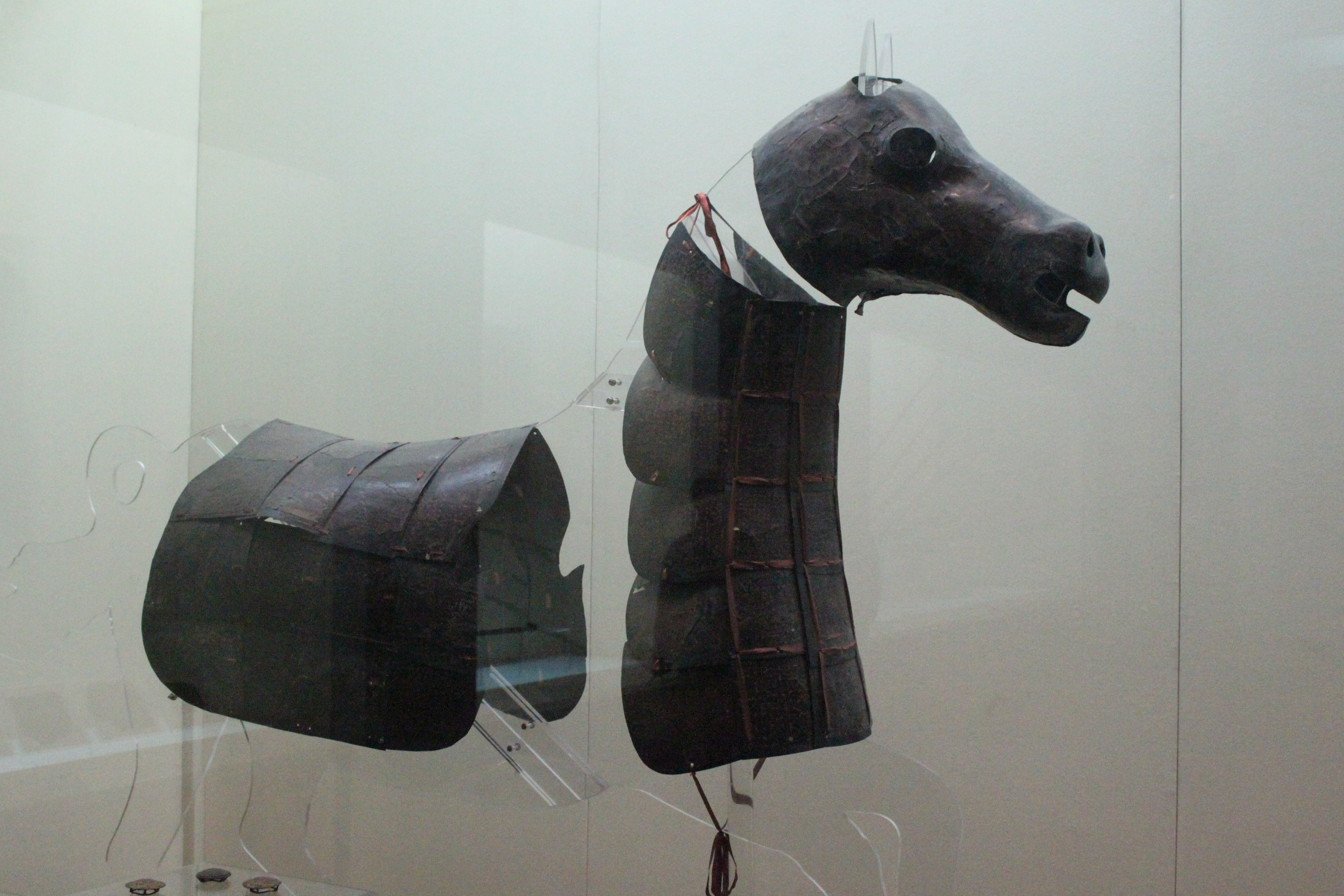
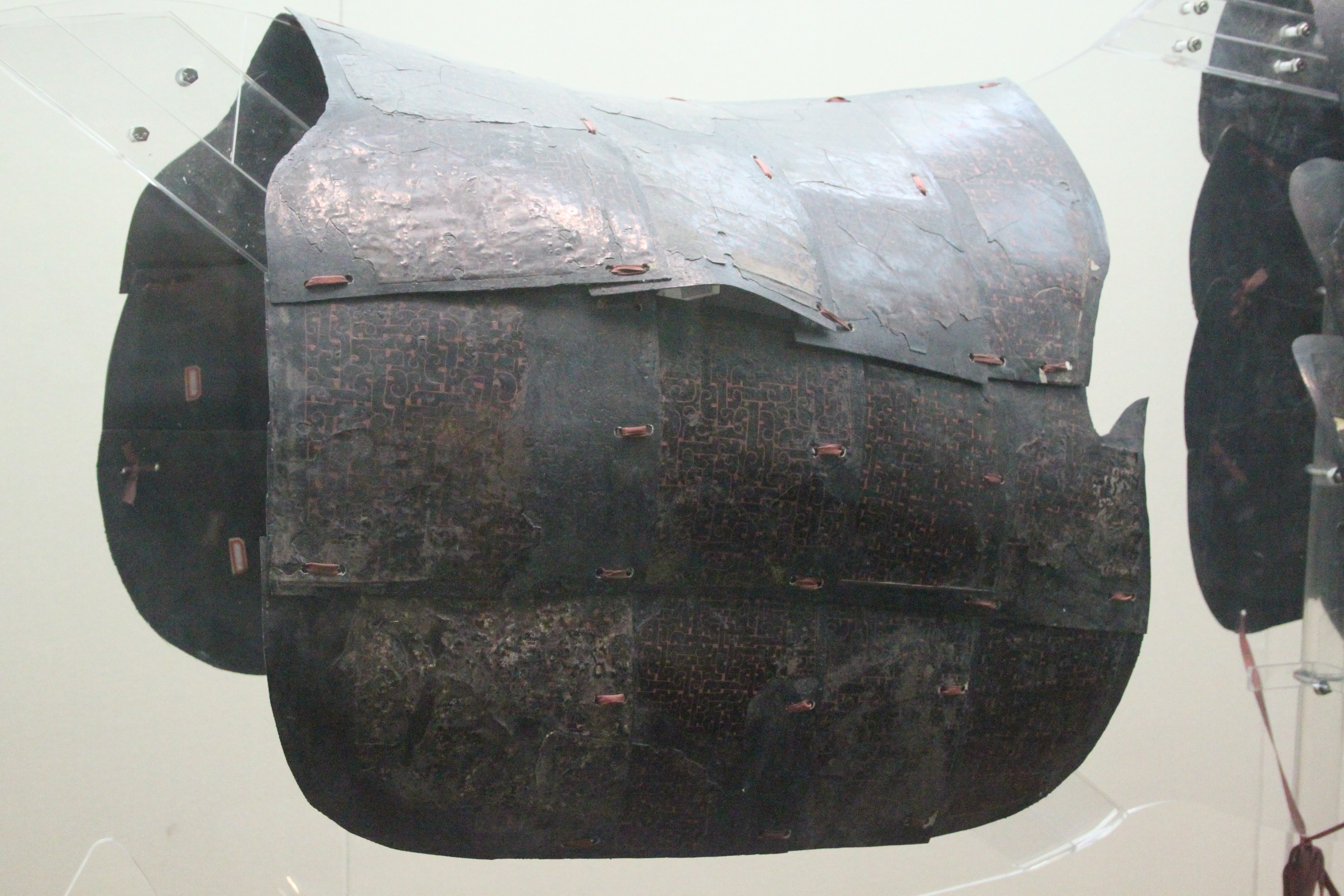
Lacquered horse armor excavated from the Tomb of Marquis Yi of Zeng, Eastern Zhou dynasty, China

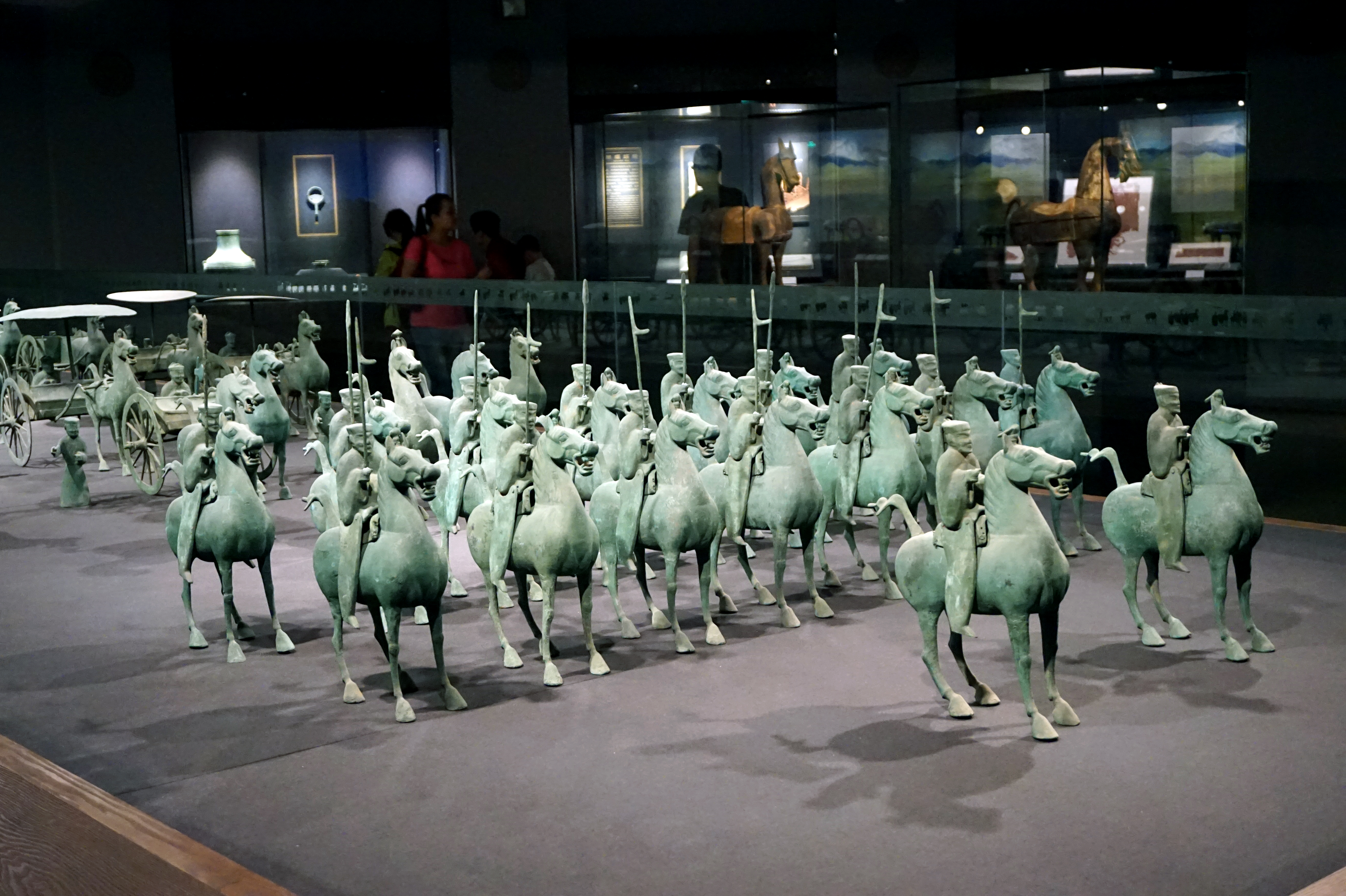
Han dynasty bronze cavalry sculptures with chariots in the rear

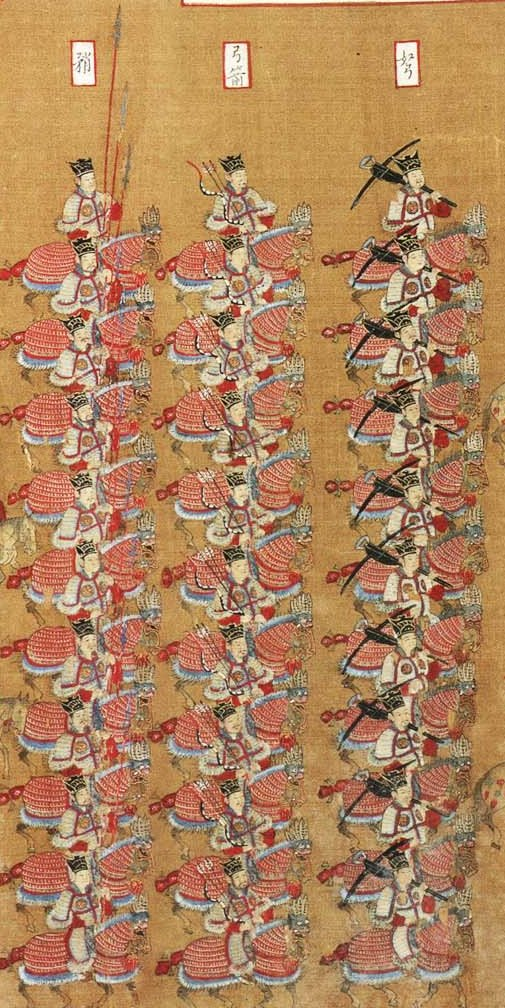
Armoured Song cavalry

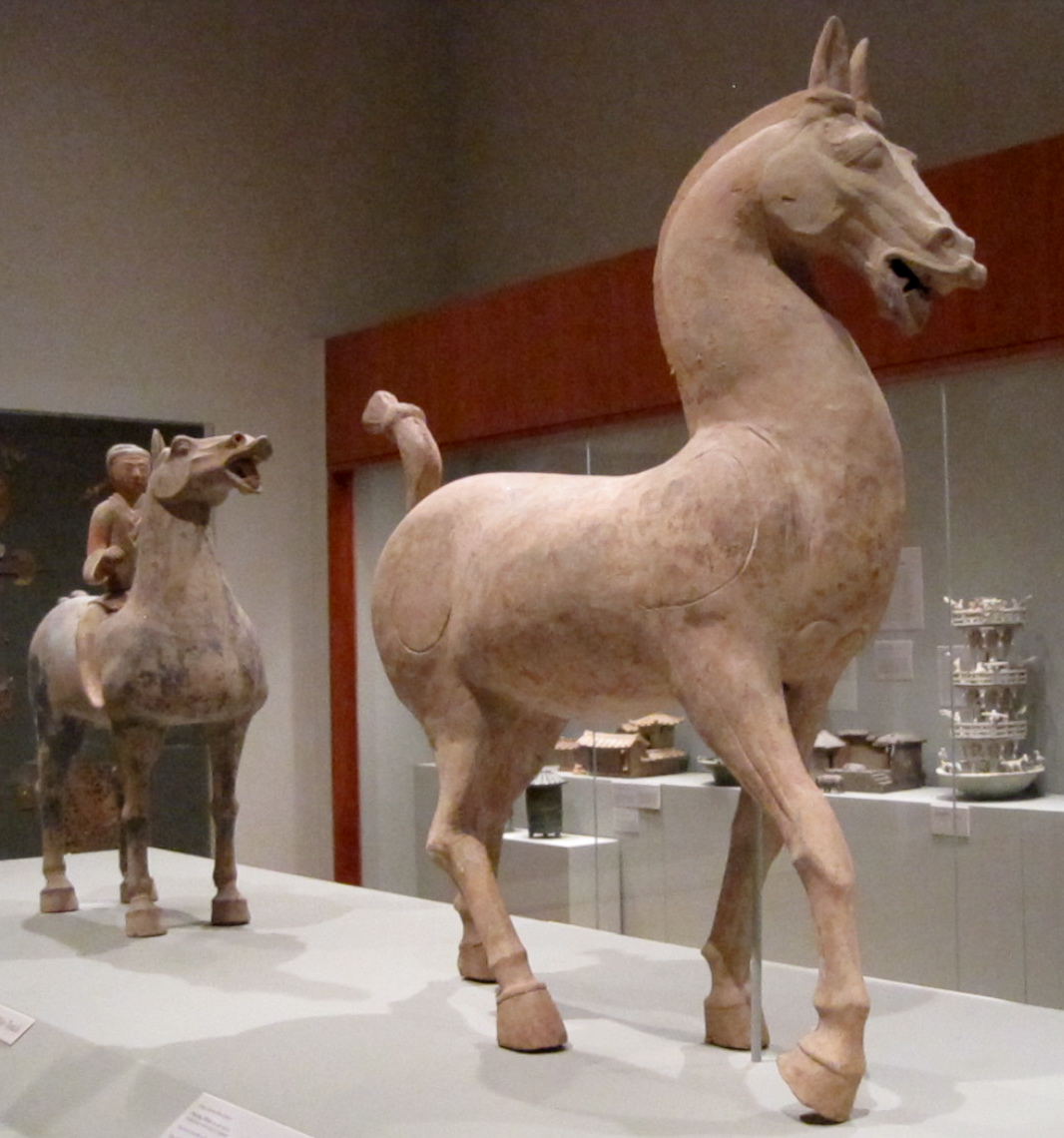
Ceramic statues of a prancing horse (foreground) and a cavalryman on horseback (background), Eastern Han dynasty (25–220 AD)

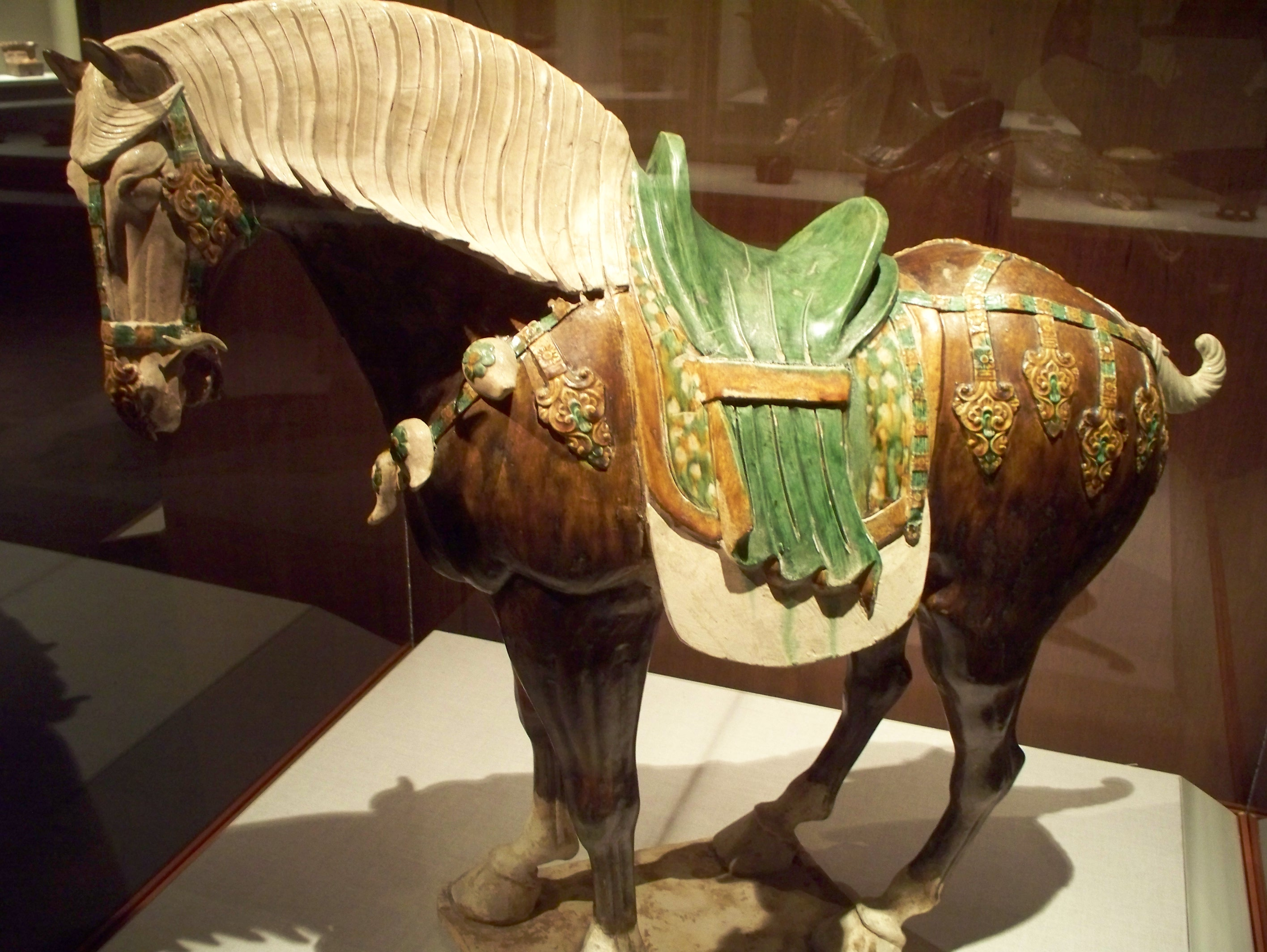
A sancai lead-glazed earthenware horse statue with a saddle, Tang dynasty (618–907 AD)

There were horse-driven chariots of the Shang (c. 1600 – c. 1050 BC) and Zhou (c. 1050 – c. 256 BC) periods, but horseback riding in China, according to David Andrew Graff, was not seen in warfare prior to the 4th century BC.

King Wuling of Zhao (340–295 BC), after realizing the advantages of light cavalry warfare over that of the heavy and cumbersome chariots, instituted reforms generally known as "胡服骑射" (wearing of the Hu-nomadic people's attire, and shooting arrows from horseback), which greatly increased the combat-effectiveness of the army of Zhao.

Although mounted archers represented an initial tactical advantage over Chinese armies, the Chinese learned to adapt. Conservative forces opposed change, which affected the proportional balance amongst cavalrymen, horse-drawn chariots and infantrymen in Chinese armies.

The benefits of using horses as light cavalry against chariots in warfare was understood when the Chinese confronted incursions from nomadic tribes of the steppes.

The Chinese used chariots for horse-based warfare until light cavalry forces became common during the Warring States era (402–221 BC). Speedy cavalry accounted, in part, for the success of the Qin dynasty (221–206 BC).

== Imperial China ==
Feeding horses was a significant problem, and many people were driven from their land so that the Imperial horses would have adequate pastures. Climate and fodder south of the Yangtze River were unfit for horses raised on the grasslands of the western steppes.

The Chinese army lacked a sufficient number of good quality horses. Importation was the only remedy but the only potential suppliers were the steppe-nomads. The strategic factor considered most essential in warfare was controlled exclusively by the merchant-traders of the most likely enemies.

The Chinese warhorses were cultivated from the vast herds roaming free on the grassy plains of northeastern China and the Mongolian plateau. The hardy Central Asian horses were generally short-legged with barrel chests. Speed was not anticipated from this configuration, but strength and endurance are characteristic features.

=== Han dynasty ===
During the Han dynasty (206 BC – 220 AD), records tell of a Chinese expedition to Fergana (in present-day Uzbekistan) and the superior horses which were acquired. The horses were acquired for military use and for breeding.

"Horses are the foundation of military power, the great resources of the state but, should this falter, the state will fall."

-- Ma Yuan (14 BC – 49 AD), a Han general and horse expert.

During the Jin dynasty (266–420), records of thousands of "armored horses" illustrate the development of warfare in this period.

=== Tang dynasty ===
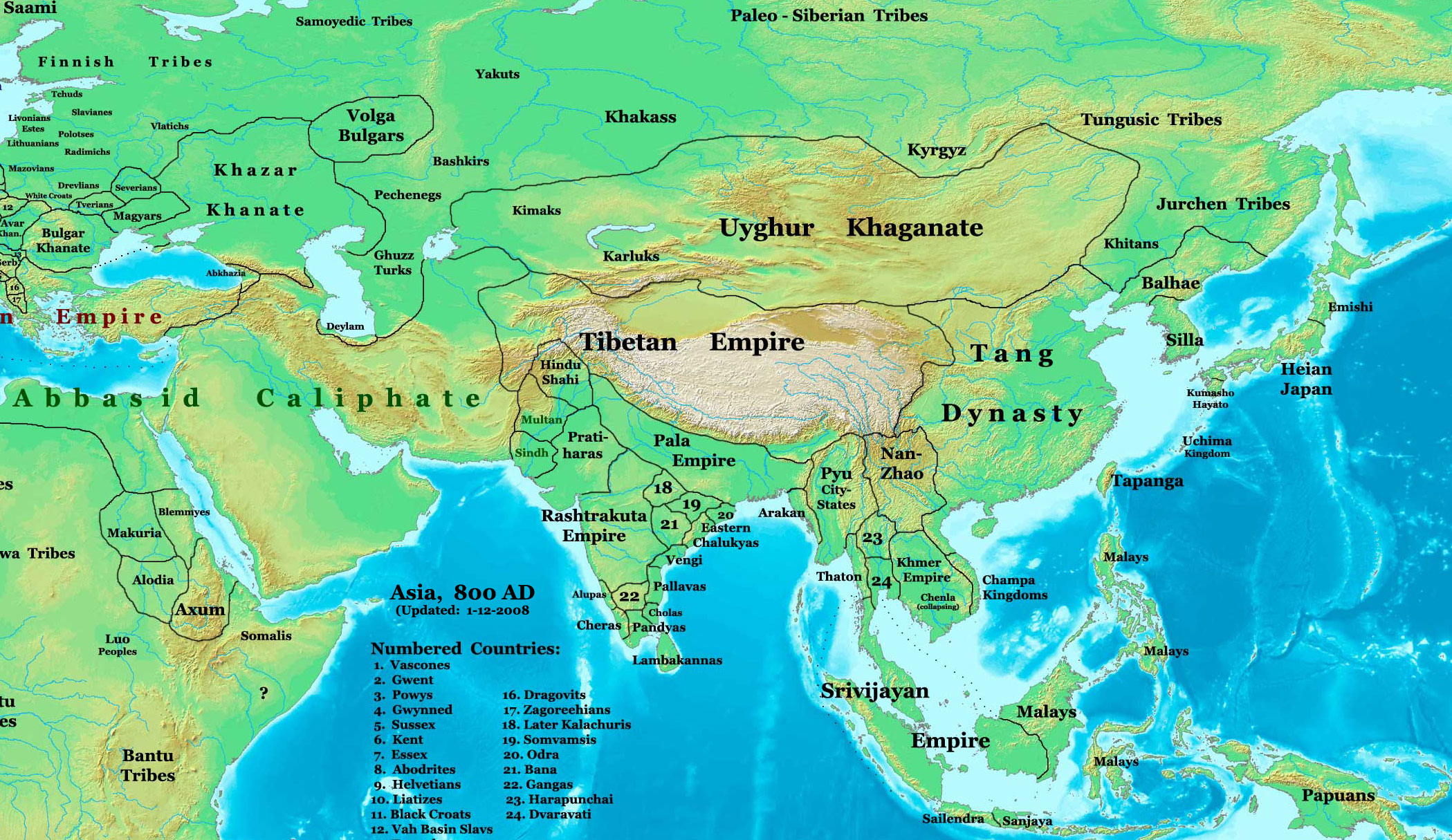
The map of Asia in 800 shows Tang China in relation to its neighbors, including the Uighur Empire of Mongolia.

Horses and skilled horsemen were often in short supply in agrarian China, and cavalry were a distinct minority in most Sui dynasty (581–618) and Tang dynasty (618–907) armies. The Imperial herds numbered 325,700 horses in 794.

=== Song dynasty ===
The Song (960–1279) through Ming dynasty (1368–1644) armies relied on an officially supervised tea-for-horse trading systems which evolved over centuries.

Tea and horses were so inextricably related that officials repeatedly requested that the tea laws and the horse administration be supervised by the same man. From the perspective of the Chinese court, government control of tea was the first step in the creation of a rational and effective policy aimed at improving the quality of horses in the army.

=== Ming dynasty ===
In the late Ming dynasty, the marked inferiority of the Chinese horses was noted by the Jesuit missionary and ambassador Matteo Ricci (1552–1610), who observed:

"[The Chinese] have countless horses in the service of the army, but these are so degenerate and lacking in martial spirit that they are put to rout even by the neighing of the Tartars' steed and so they are practically useless in battle."

=== Qing dynasty ===
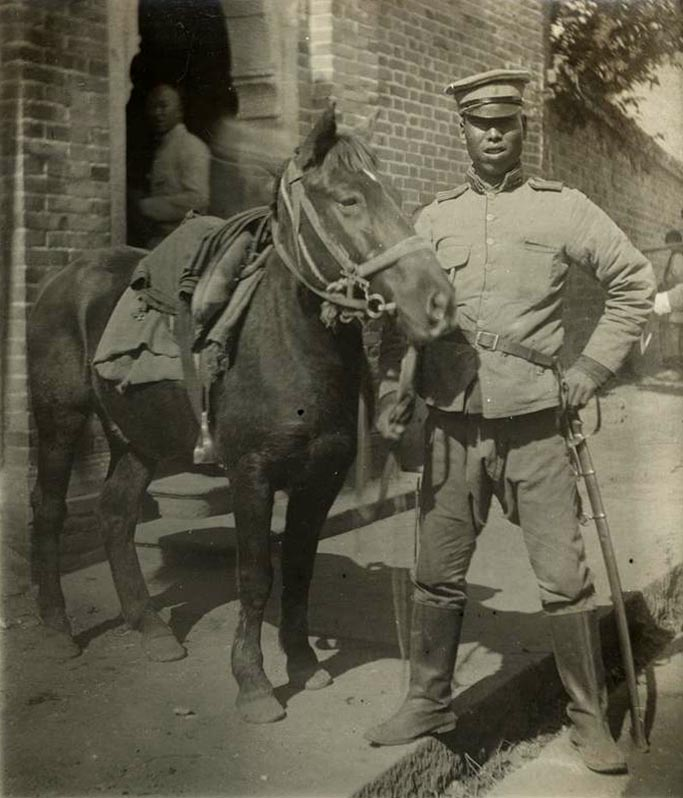
Chinese cavalry of the Qing New Army

== See also ==
- Domestication of the horse
- Horses in Chinese culture
- Horse in Chinese mythology
- Horses in East Asian warfare
- History of the horse in the Indian subcontinent

== Sources ==
- Wan, Xiang (2013-01-01). The Horse in Pre-Imperial China (Thesis). University of Pennsylvania.
- Cooke, Bill, ed. (2000). Imperial China: the art of the horse in Chinese history ; exhibition catalog (First ed.). Lexington, KY: Kentucky Horse Park / Art Media Resources Ltd. ISBN 978-1-56469-071-5.
- Sterckx, Roel; Siebert, Martina; Schäfer, Dagmar, eds. (2018). Animals through Chinese History: Earliest Times to 1911. Cambridge: Cambridge University Press. ISBN 978-1-108-42815-6.
- Morgan, Carole (1974). "Dogs and Horses in Ancient China". Journal of the Hong Kong Branch of the Royal Asiatic Society. 14: 58–67. ISSN 0085-5774.
- Schottenhammer, Angela (2009). "Horses in Late Imperial China and Maritime East Asia:". Pferde in Asien: Geschichte, Handel und Kultur: 229.
