= Horse (zodiac) =

Sign of the Chinese zodiac

- "Horse" in Traditional (top) and Simplified (bottom) Chinese characters
- Traditional Chinese: 馬
- Simplified Chinese: 马
Transcriptions
Standard Mandarin
- Hanyu Pinyin: mǎ
- Wade–Giles: ma^{3}
- IPA: [mà]
Hakka
- Romanization: mâ
Yue: Cantonese
- Yale Romanization: máah
- Jyutping: maa5
- IPA: [ma˩˧]
Southern Min
- Hokkien POJ: má / bé
Eastern Min
- Fuzhou BUC: mā
Northern Min
- Jian'ou Romanized: mǎ
Old Chinese
- Baxter (1992): *mraʔ
- Baxter–Sagart (2014): *mˤraʔ

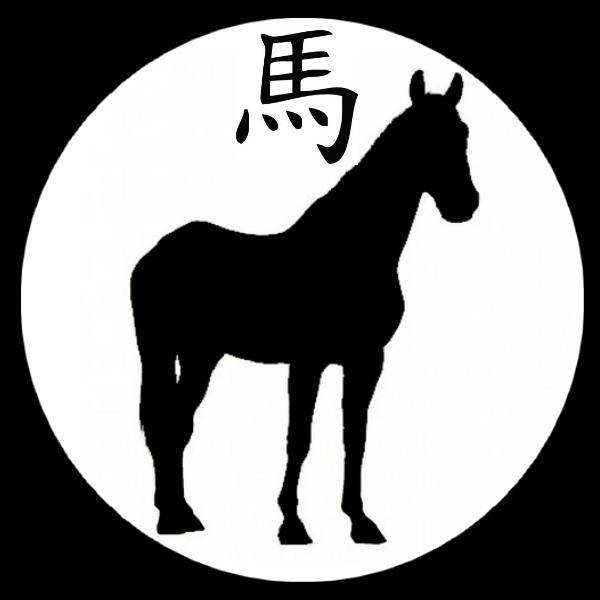
Zodiac horse, showing the mǎ (⾺) character for horse

The Horse (⾺) is the seventh of the 12-year cycle of animals which appear in the Chinese zodiac related to the Chinese calendar. There is a long tradition of the Horse in Chinese mythology. Certain characteristics of the Horse nature are supposed to be typical of or to be associated with either a year of the Horse and its events, or in regard to the personality of someone born in such a year. Horse aspects can also enter by other chronomantic factors or measures, such as hourly. The Year of the Horse is associated with the Earthly Branch symbol 午.

== History ==
The lunar calendar paved the sequence of the Chinese zodiac animals. This calendar can be traced back to the 14th century B.C. Myths say that Emperor Huangdi, the first Chinese emperor, in 2637 B.C. invented the Chinese lunar calendar, which follows the cycles of the moon. In a folklore story that explains the origins of the cycle, the animals hold a race to determine their order. The custom of pairing an animal with a year in a 12-year cycle can be traced back to at least the Han dynasty (201 BC – 220 AD), and there are many legends and folktales surrounding the 12 zodiac animals, which are often depicted in East Asian art and design. A group of Chinese figures in the Victoria and Albert Museum's collection shows the zodiac animals with human bodies but animal heads. This way of portraying them became popular in the Tang dynasty (8th century).

== Years and the Five Elements ==
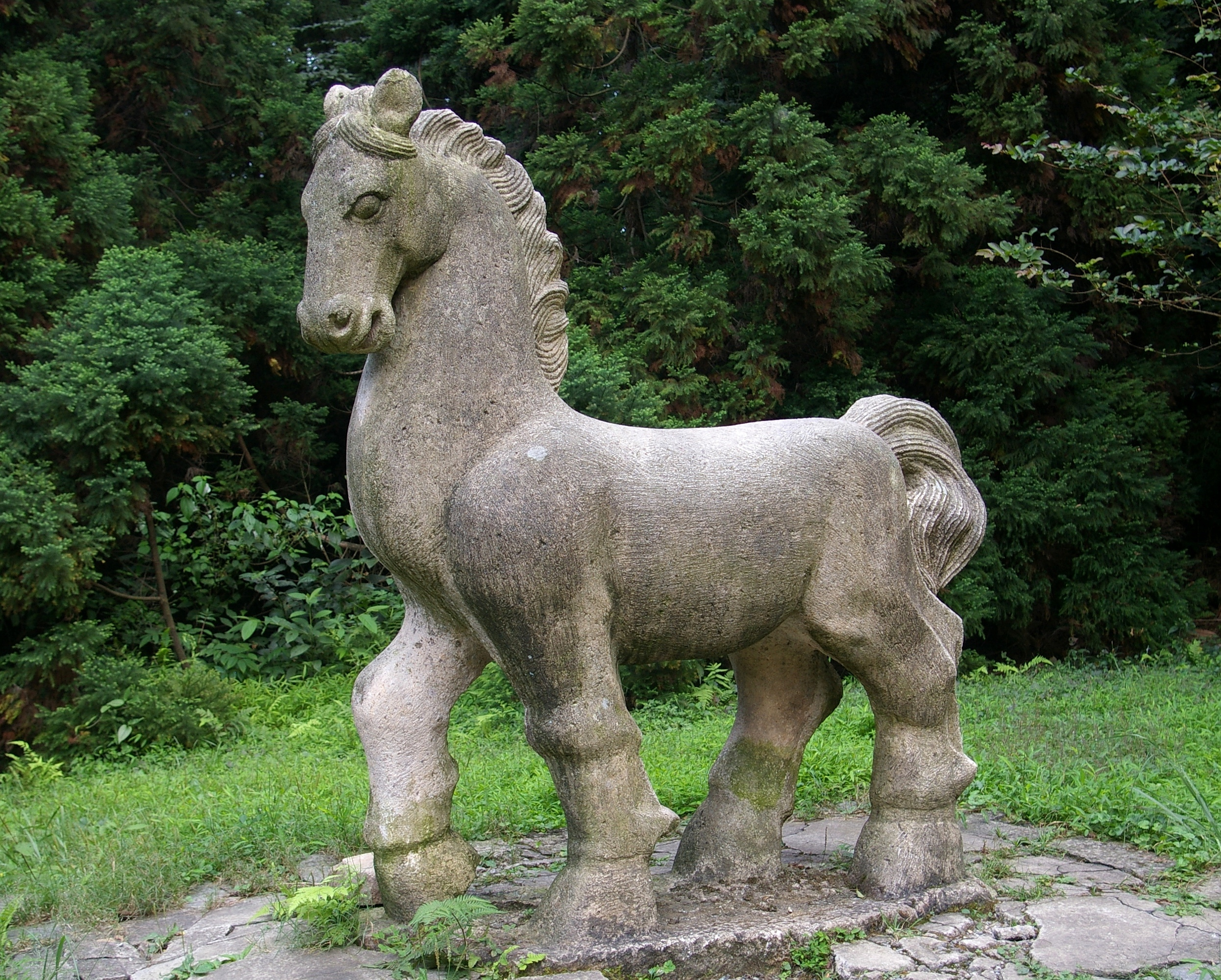
Sculpture of Horse from Chinese zodiac in the park at Mount Mogan in Deqing County, Zhejiang, China

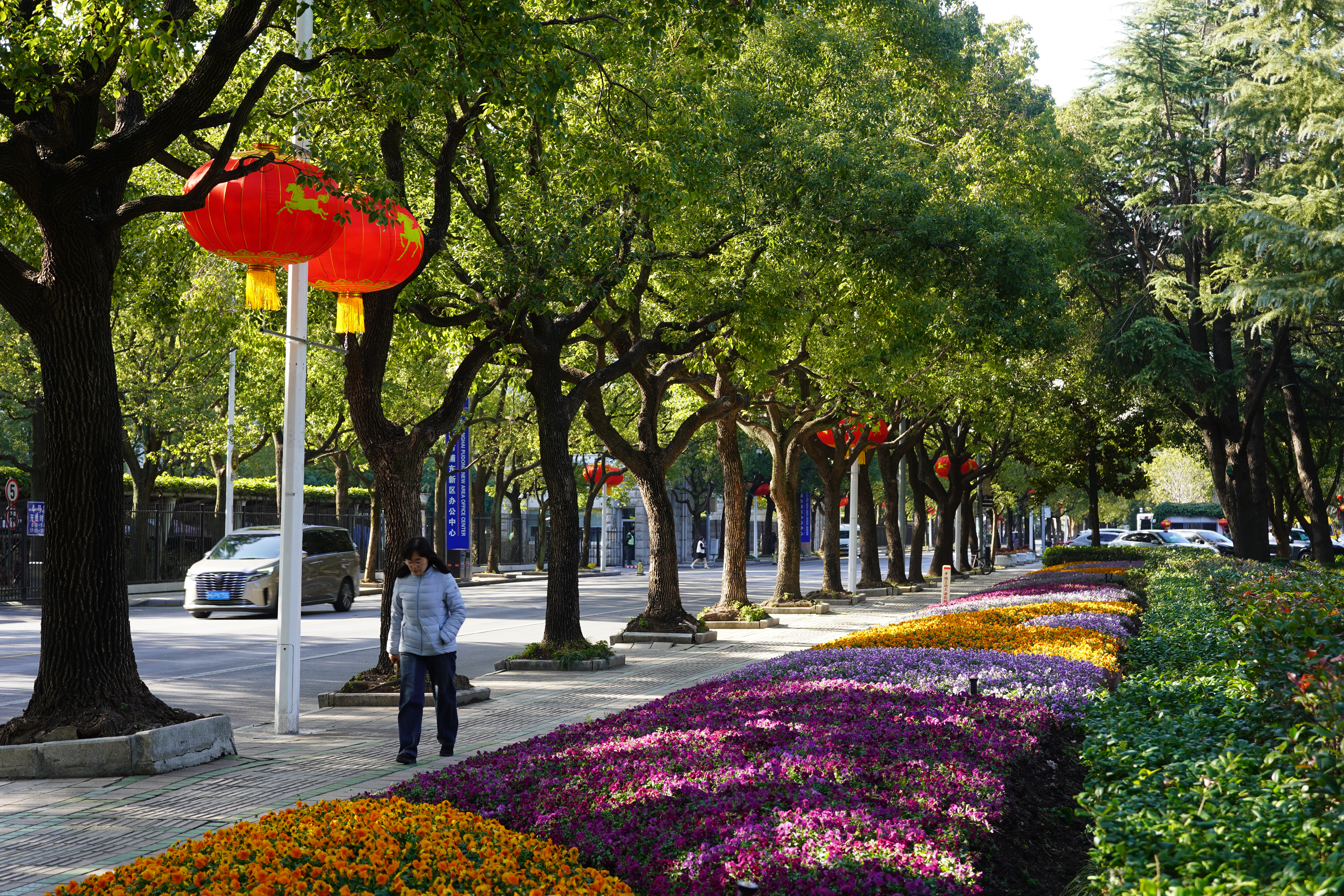
A street in Pudong (Shanghai, China), during the 2026 Chinese New Year. Horses are visible on the lanterns

People born within these date ranges can be said to have been born in the "Year of the Horse", while also bearing the following elemental sign:

Start date	End date	Heavenly branch
25 January 1906	12 February 1907	Fire Horse
11 February 1918	31 January 1919	Earth Horse
30 January 1930	16 February 1931	Metal Horse
15 February 1942	4 February 1943	Water Horse
3 February 1954	23 January 1955	Wood Horse
21 January 1966	8 February 1967	Fire Horse
7 February 1978	27 January 1979	Earth Horse
27 January 1990	14 February 1991	Metal Horse
12 February 2002	31 January 2003	Water Horse
31 January 2014	18 February 2015	Wood Horse
17 February 2026	5 February 2027	Fire Horse
4 February 2038	23 January 2039	Earth Horse
23 January 2050	10 February 2051	Metal Horse
9 February 2062	28 January 2063	Water Horse
27 January 2074	14 February 2075	Wood Horse
14 February 2086	2 February 2087	Fire Horse
1 February 2098	20 January 2099	Earth Horse
19 February 2110	7 February 2111	Metal Horse
7 February 2122	26 January 2123	Water Horse
25 January 2134	12 February 2135	Wood Horse
11 February 2146	31 January 2147	Fire Horse
30 January 2158	17 February 2159	Earth Horse
16 February 2170	4 February 2171	Metal Horse
3 February 2182	23 January 2183	Water Horse
22 January 2194	9 February 2195	Wood Horse
9 February 2206	28 January 2207	Fire Horse
28 January 2218	15 February 2219	Earth Horse
14 February 2230	2 February 2231	Metal Horse
1 February 2242	19 February 2243	Water Horse
18 February 2254	7 February 2255	Wood Horse
6 February 2266	25 January 2267	Fire Horse
24 January 2278	11 February 2279	Earth Horse
11 February 2290	30 January 2291	Metal Horse

== Basic astrology elements ==
Earthly Branches of Birth Year:	Wu
The Five Elements:	Fire
Yin Yang:	Yang
Cardinal Point:	South (S)
Lunar Month:	June 7 to July 6
Lucky Numbers:	4, 5, 7; Avoid: 2, 3, 6
Lucky Flowers:	Sunflower, Jasmine
Lucky Colors:	Gold, orange, yellow, red; Avoid: black, green, blue
Season:	Summer
Lucky/Associated Countries:	South Africa, Mexico, Brazil, Mongolia, Romania, Colombia

== See also ==
- Burmese zodiac
- Chinese astrology
- Chinese New Year
- Horse
- Horse worship
- Horses in Chinese culture
- Fire Horse
