= Chinese Mongolian horse =

Mongolian horse breed in China

Chinese Mongol horse
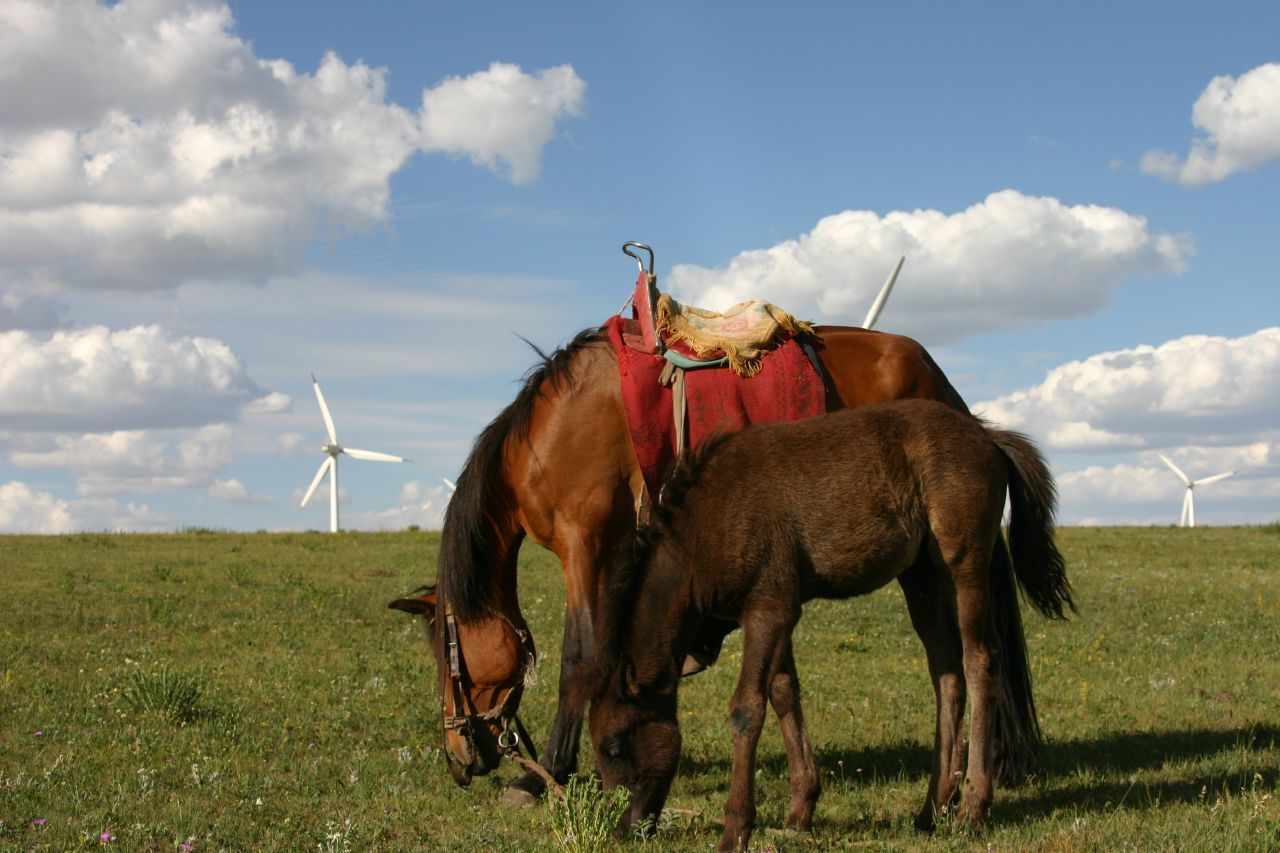
- Mare and foal in Inner Mongolia
- Country of origin: Inner Mongolia, China
- Use: Saddle horse, mare milk, horse meat, and packhorse

Traits
- Weight: From 300 kg to 360 kg
- Height: From 1.22 m to 1.42 m
- Color: Bay, black, and gray

The Chinese Mongolian (simplified Chinese: 蒙古马; traditional Chinese: 蒙古馬; pinyin: Ménggǔ mǎ) is a breed of horse, corresponding to the population of Mongolian horses that remained in China after Mongolia's independence in 1910. Possibly descended from Przewalski's horse, it has been domesticated since ancient times. As of 1982, Chinese Mongolian horses comprised about one-third of all horses in China. However, their numbers have declined sharply in recent decades, largely due to the rise of mechanized transport and changing lifestyles.

Characterized as a small, sturdy horse with exceptional endurance, the Chinese Mongolian is categorized into four types: Ujumqin, Abaga, Baicha, and Wushen. These horses are commonly used for riding and as packhorses to transport local people. Additionally, mares produce milk, which is harvested and consumed as a traditional beverage. While the breed is primarily found in Inner Mongolia, it also exists in smaller numbers in neighboring areas.

== History ==
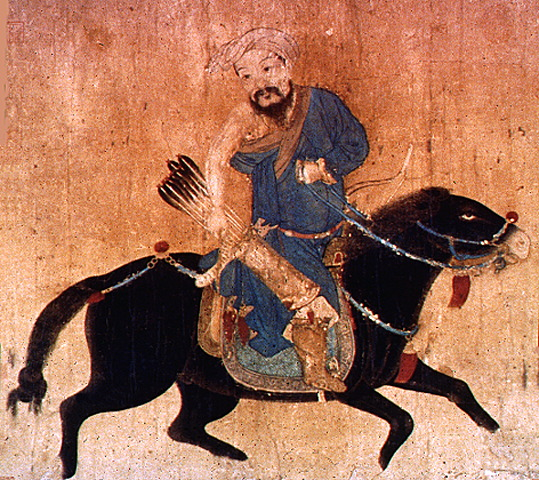
Chinese painting of a Mongolian horse rider painted during the Ming dynasty, in the 15th or 16th century

Although Mongolian horse populations share the same genetic origin, they are bred differently in Mongolia (Outer Mongolia) and China (Inner Mongolia), which justifies the distinction between the two breeds: Mongolian horse and Chinese Mongolian horse. Both breeds are among the oldest horse breeds in the world, with estimates suggesting domestication occurred on the Mongolian plateau around 2000 BC. However, mitochondrial DNA studies indicate that horses may have been domesticated in present-day northern China as early as 4000 to 5000 BC. These studies suggest a close genetic relationship to Przewalski's horse, indicating that some Chinese Mongolian horses may be descended from it. Overall, the Chinese Mongolian horse appears to descend from multiple maternal lines and is genetically very similar to the Mongolian horse.

By the 7th century, the small Mongolian horse was widely present across the steppes of what is now northern China. Out-breedings occurred as a result of diplomatic gifts from Central Asian kingdoms, but during this period, the Mongolian horse was not favored by the Chinese imperial court, which preferred larger, more refined horses from Persia (Iran) and Central Asia. Under the Song dynasty, the Mongolian horse spread throughout China's three northern provinces, reaching an estimated population of 40,000 by the end of the Qing dynasty.

The cultural significance of the Mongolian horse in China increased markedly after the Tang dynasty, particularly between the 13th and 16th centuries, as evidenced by artistic depictions from the Yuan and Ming dynasties. Trade between China and Mongolia flourished during this time, with a substantial portion of the China-Mongolia border dedicated to the trade of horses and sheep. Mongolian herders frequently exchanged their horses for silk, satin, cotton, needles, and other goods.

After the independence of Outer Mongolia in 1910, Mongolian horses from Inner Mongolia gradually spread to neighboring provinces, and experiments to "improve" the breed were carried out by the Chinese. However, these "improved" horses remained a distinct minority. The theoretical separation of the Mongolian and Chinese Mongolian horse is a relatively recent phenomenon, emerging over the last century, which helps explain the close genetic relationship between the two breeds. The Chinese Mongolian horse has historically been widespread in the plains of Inner Mongolia, where it is raised in large semi-wild herds following traditional herding practices. In 1982, the population was estimated at 1.7 million, comprising one-third of all horses in China. By 2005, the number of horses had more than halved due to advances in motorization and the reduction in available grazing areas. Since then, the breed's decline and associated traditions have continued.

== Description ==
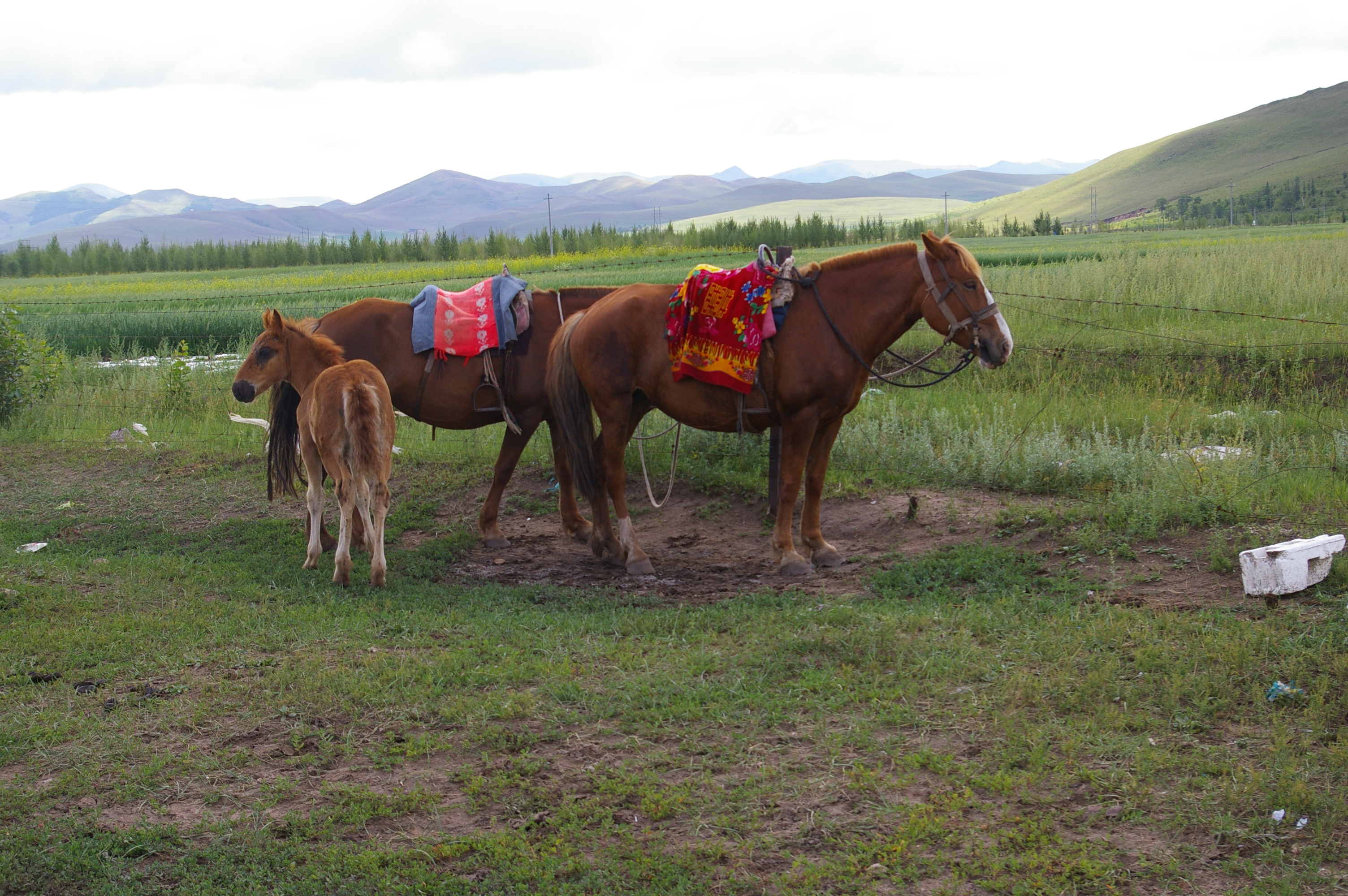
Chestnut horses ridden for tourism in Inner Mongolia

The Chinese Mongolian horse is modeled similarly to the Mongolian horse and is regarded locally as a horse rather than a pony. It features a rectilinear head profile, characterized by a broad forehead, open nostrils, protruding eyes, and long ears. The neck is short and muscular, the chest is deep, and the shoulder is fairly sloping and robust. The withers are not very prominent; the back is short, solid, and straight. The croup is long and sloping. The legs are short, strong, and solid. The breed is renowned for its solid constitution. The average height is approximately 1.28 meters, with mares averaging 1.27 meters and males 1.30 meters. Weight ranges from 300 to 360 kg, with males averaging 360 kg and females 300 kg. Variations in size exist depending on the type; for instance, a 2007 study by the University of Oklahoma reported a height range of 1.21 to 1.42 meters, while a 2016 study by CAB International reported a range of 1.22 to 1.42 meters. Size tends to increase significantly under favorable environmental conditions.

=== Coats ===
The Chinese Mongolian horse exhibits a wide range of coat colors, with bay, black, chestnut, and gray being the most common, although rare instances of white horses have been noted. All coat colors can potentially be found within the breed.

=== Temperament and care ===
The breeding method for the Chinese Mongolian horse is semi-wild, allowing young horses to be quickly trained to respond to rider commands. While some authors describe the breed as temperamental, it is generally reputed to have a good temperament and is often ridden by children. Chinese Mongolian horses demonstrate excellent stamina, capable of covering 120 km in less than 8 hours and 28 to 30 km in 35 to 40 minutes. The breed is well-adapted to a wide range of temperatures, from -50 to 35 °C. In winter, these horses dig through up to 40 cm of snow to find food. They are raised extensively, without free access to water, in nomadic or transhumant systems.

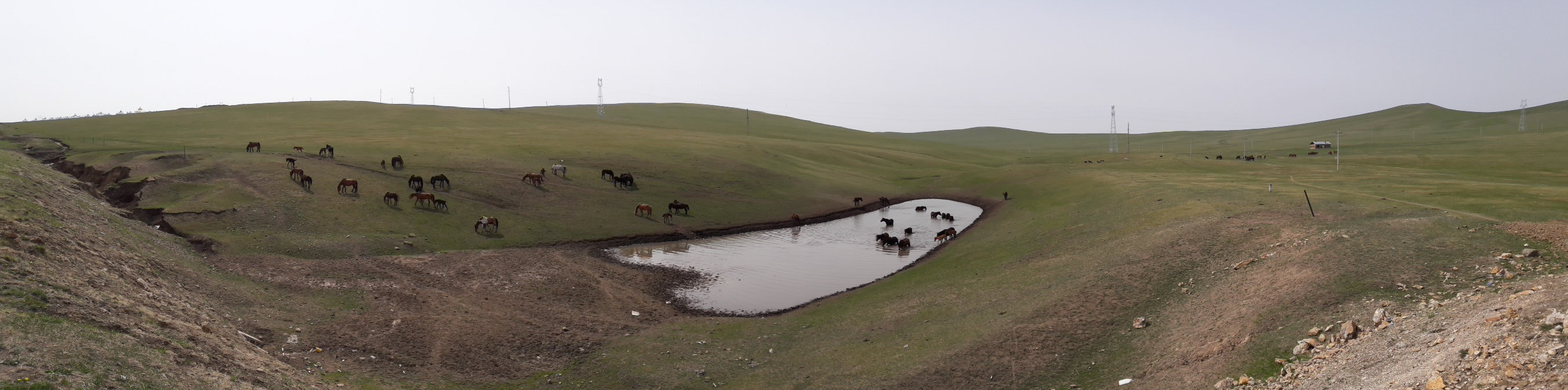
Horses in taboon at Hulunbuir

=== Types ===
There are four known types of Chinese Mongolian horses: the Abaga, the Baicha, the Ujumqin, and the Wushen. The Baicha is a small, sturdy mountain horse on the verge of extinction, originally from central-western Inner Mongolia. It was once known as the "iron-hoofed horse", thanks to its sure-footedness in all types of terrain. Among the different types, the Ujumqin and Wushen are the most genetically related, despite the considerable geographical distance between their breeding areas. This genetic similarity is likely due to the exchange of breeding stock among breeders.

==== Abaga ====
The Abaga (simplified Chinese: 阿巴加马; traditional Chinese: 阿巴加馬; pinyin: Abaga) averages 1.36 m to 1.40 m in height and is predominantly black, more rarely dark bay. It comes from the Abag Banner in the Xilingol League. The Delachaux guide (2014) refers to this breed under the erroneous name of "Agaba". The CAB International book does refer to the breed as "Abaga", as do scientific publications on the subject.

==== Ujumqin ====
The Ujumqin type (simplified Chinese: 乌珠穆沁马; traditional Chinese: 烏珠穆沁馬; pinyin: Wū zhū mù qìn mǎ, also named "Wuchumutsin" and "Wuzhumuqin"), is found in the Xilingol League region of eastern Inner Mongolia. Considered more elegant, it reaches a higher height. Better conformed thanks to the quality of the grass in its native territory, it is mainly used as a saddle horse. An "improved" version of the Mongolian horse, it features the steppe horse type and a light model. It has a remarkable aptitude for work.

===== Wushen =====
The Wushen type is relatively small, averaging 1.22 m in height. There are around 18,000 of these horses in the western and central steppes of Inner Mongolia, particularly in the Otog Banner around Ordos. Its distinctive features include extra gaits and a dry model.

=== Genetic analysis ===
A study on the average nucleotide mutation rate in the D-loop of mitochondrial DNA across four Chinese Mongolian horses revealed a mutation rate of 3.69%. In comparison, the mutation rate in Thoroughbreds is 4%.

== Usage ==
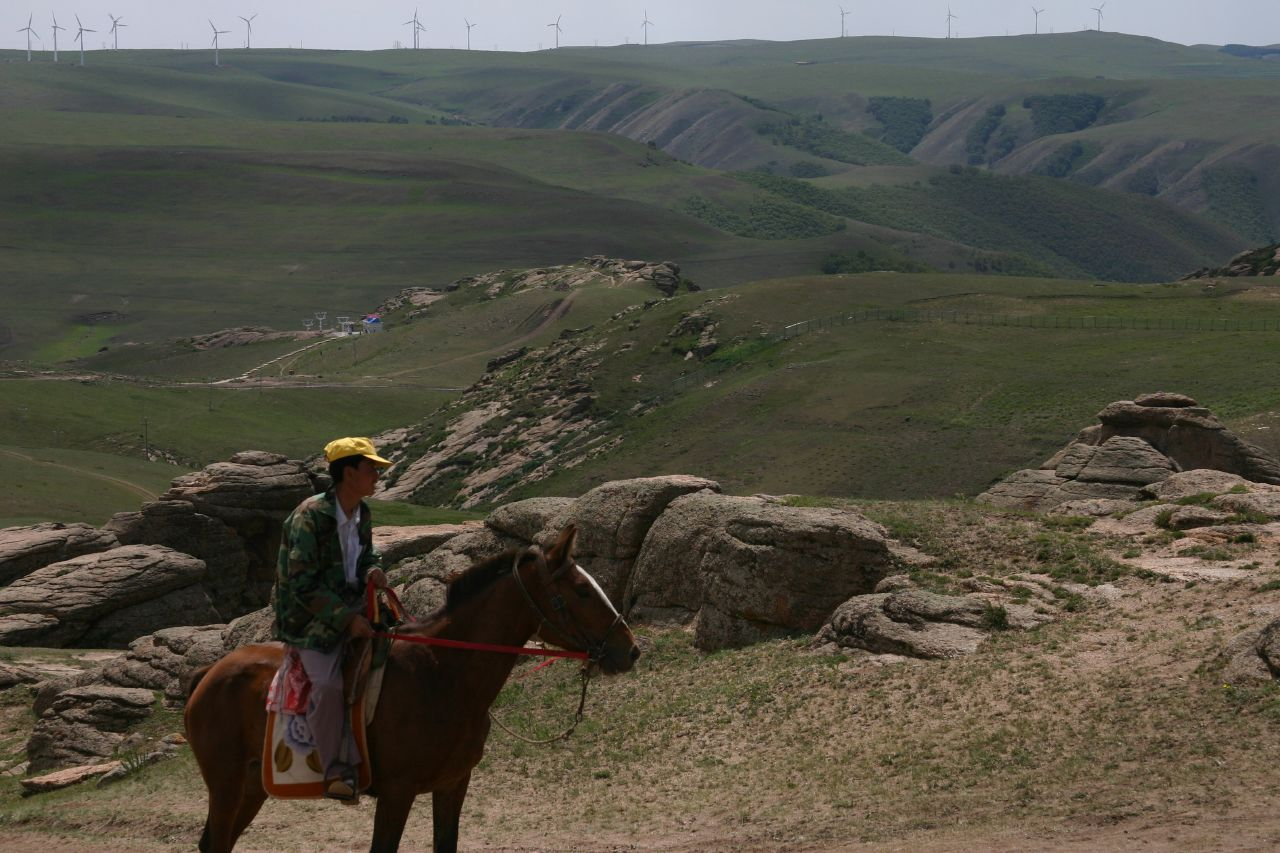
Horse rider in Inner Mongolia, circa Huitengxile

The Chinese Mongolian horse is primarily utilized for riding and the production of mare's milk in Inner Mongolia, where mares are typically milked five times a day. Record milk production during a single lactation can exceed 300 to 400 kg. The meat from these horses can be eaten, representing a vital product for the nomadic population. In other provinces, Chinese Mongolian horses are also used as packhorses, noted for their ability to carry heavy loads while foraging for their food.

Chinese Mongolian horses are often employed in crossbreeding programs to produce "improved" breeds, such as the Sanhe. However, the Sanhe is genetically quite distinct from its ancestor.

== Breeding spread ==
There is artistic, documentary, and archaeological evidence suggesting the possible presence of Chinese-type horses in North America prior to the 2nd millennium CE.

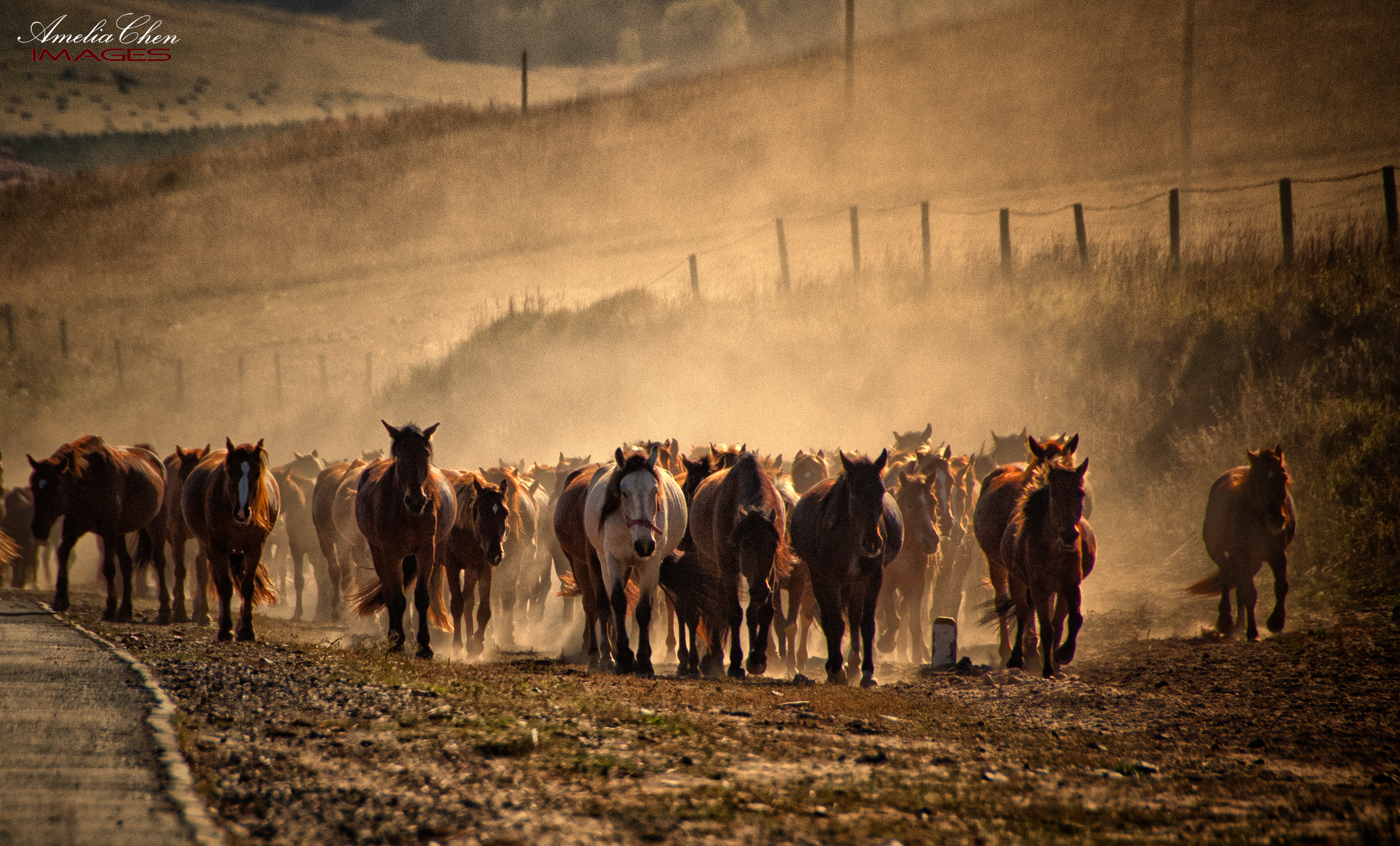
A hundred Chinese Mongolian horses near Bashang

According to the FAO, the population of Chinese Mongolian horses was estimated to be between 50,000 and 86,700 in 2005. Although the breed is not considered endangered, it is subject to monitoring.

The Chinese Mongolian mainly inhabits Inner Mongolia, but also various regions of northern China, such as western Heilongjiang, Gansu, Xinjiang, and Qinghai.

== In culture ==
The Chinese Mongolian horse is present in modern Chinese literature, notably in Chinese-language poems that draw on Mongolian ethnic traditions, such as the 1993 poem Menggu ma by A'ertai.

== See also ==
- List of horse breeds
- Horses in Chinese culture
- Abaga horse
- Ujumqin horse

== Bibliography ==
- Hendricks, Bonnie (2007). "Chinese Mongolian". International Encyclopedia of Horse Breeds. University of Oklahoma Press. ISBN 978-0-8061-3884-8.
- Li, Jinlian; Shi, Youfei; Fan, Caiyun; Manglai, Dugarjaviin (2008). mtDNA diversity and origin of Chinese Mongolian horses (PDF). Vol. 21. Asian-Aust. J. Anim. Sci.
- Mang, L. (2002). Mongolian man and horse. Inner Mongolia Science and Technology Press.
- Porter, Valerie; Alderson, Lawrence; Hall, Stephen; Sponenberg, Dan Phillip (2016). Mason's World Encyclopedia of Livestock Breeds and Breeding (6th ed.). CAB International. ISBN 978-1-84593-466-8.
- Puel, Caroline (1989). "Où sont donc passés les chevaux chinois ?". Le petit livre du cheval en Chine, Favre. Caracole (in French). ISBN 978-2-8289-0331-2.
- Rousseau, Élise (2014). Tous les chevaux du monde (in French). Delachaux et Niestlé. ISBN 978-2-603-01865-1.
- Zheng, Piliu (1984). "Horses". Livestock Breeds of China. Food and Agriculture Organization. ISBN 92-5-102185-6.
