= Chakouyi =

Horse breed native to Gansu, China

- Country of origin: China
- Distribution: Gansu, China
- Use: Riding horse

Traits
- Weight: Male: 304 to 320 kg
- Height: Male: 1.23 m to 1.30 m (average)
- Color: Usually light bay, less commonly gray, chestnut, or black
- Distinguishing features: Dry, medium-sized head with a straight profile; strong hooves

The Chakouyi (simplified Chinese: 岔口驿马; traditional Chinese: 岔口驛馬; pinyin: Chàkǒu yì mǎ), or Chakou post horse, is a horse breed native to Gansu, China, whose history is linked to the Silk Road and the development of post houses in China. This small, ambling saddle horse has endured to the present day, although the breed's numbers have been declining in recent years. It has been noted for its rich genetic diversity.

== History ==
The history of the Chakouyi is closely linked to that of the Silk Road and horse mail since its breeding developed along these trade and communication routes under the name 岔口驿马 (chakouyi), which roughly translates as “transmission station by road.” Horses with good stamina were needed to carry goods, messages, military orders, and the Emperor's instructions, particularly from 206 BC to 907 BC, when farms were set up all along the route to meet this need for horses. These animals were frequently shown in public, both imperially and privately. Buddhist temples hold the best breeding stallions of the breed. Although the use of Chakouyi in post houses and on the Silk Road gradually disappeared, breeding continued, as good saddle horses were still needed for hosting activities.

== Description ==
The Chakouyi is well adapted to the rigors of its environment, long-lived, and resistant to disease. The average height of mares is 1.23 m, and that of males is 1.30 m. Average weights range from 320 to 304 kg. The animal is solidly built, with a square silhouette. The head is medium-sized, lean, and straight, with large, bright eyes and small ears, usually pointing forward. The neck is moderately long. The withers are long without being high, the chest is broad and deep, the back is of medium length, and the loins are broad but short. The belly is rounded, the croup sloping, and well-muscled. Joints and tendons are well developed, legs show little dewlap, and are renowned for their good quality.

The coat is always plain. The light bay is the most common, but gray, chestnut, and black are also found. Many have a star-shaped head.

The Chakouyi has the particularity of being able to go amble naturally, the knowledge of this gait being transmissible to offspring. Like most native Chinese breeds, the Chakouyi has good genetic diversity, with many different maternal lines.

== Breeding spread ==
The Chakouyi is considered common and native to China. It is found in the Tibetan Autonomous Xian regions of Tianzhu, Yongdeng, and Gulang, all in Gansu. The FAO counted 24,000 animals in 1980, and then, in 1991, the total herd was between 10,000 and 18,648 heads, with a downward trend. In 2006, the number of Chakouyi horses had fallen even further, to something between 8,356 and 9,855 heads. The Chakouyi is officially recognized by the Chinese government under the standard number GB/T 24703-2009. According to the FAO's 2007 assessment, this horse is not threatened with extinction.

== See also ==
- List of horse breeds
- Horses in Chinese culture

== Bibliography ==
- Hendricks, Bonnie Lou (2007). "Chakouyi". International Encyclopedia of Horse Breeds. Norman: University of Oklahoma Press. p. 486. ISBN 9780806138848.
- Porter, Valerie (2002). "Chakouyi". Mason's World Dictionary of Livestock Breeds, Types and Varieties. CABI. p. 380. ISBN 9780851994307.
- Puel, Caroline (1989). "Où sont donc passés les chevaux chinois ? - Le petit livre du cheval en Chine" [Where have all the Chinese horses gone? - The Little Book of the Horse in China]. Études chinoises. 漢學研究 (in French). 8 (2). Favre: 128–132.
