= Hequ horse =

Breed of horse

Hequ Horse
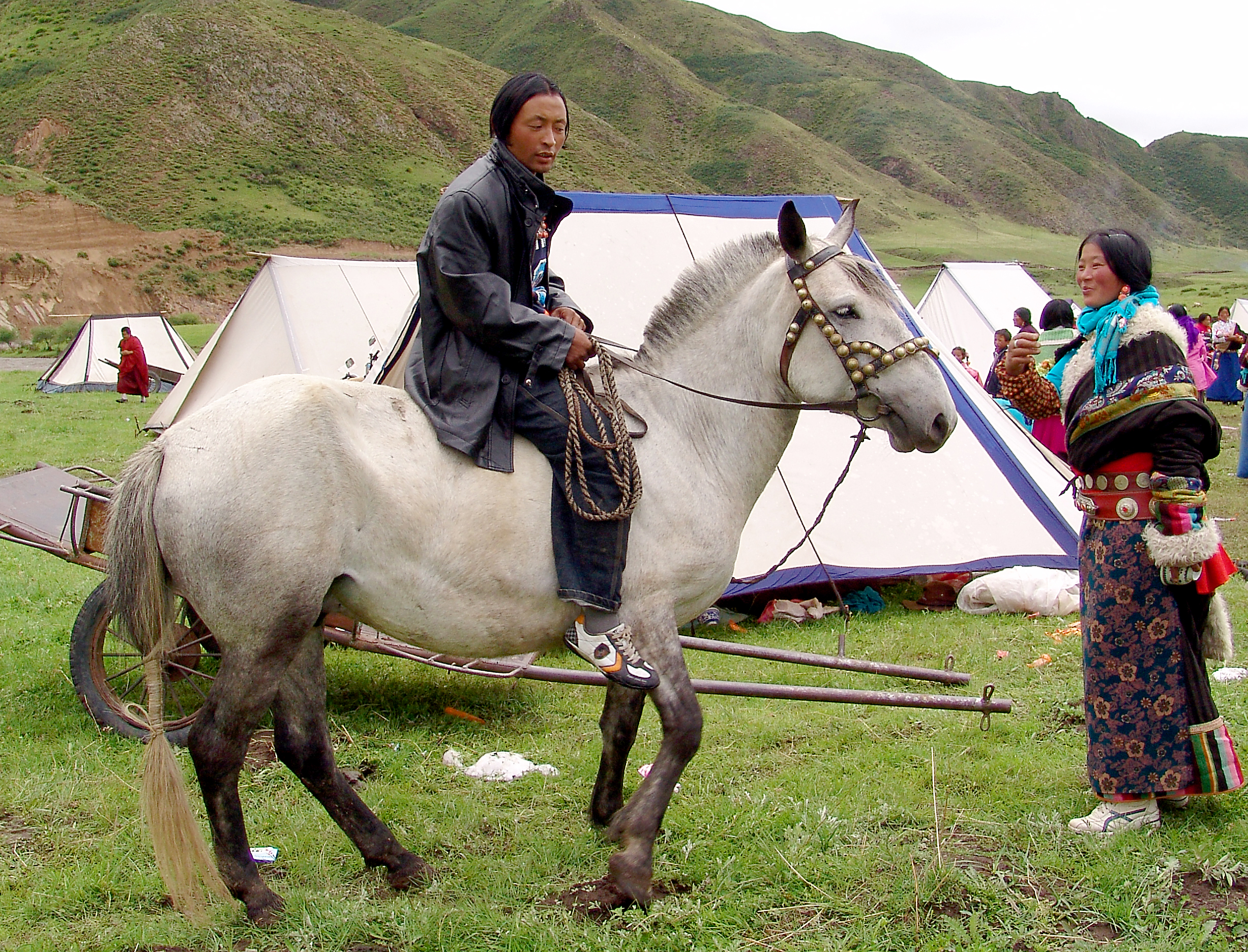
- Hequ horse
- Country of origin: Tibet, China

The Hequ horse, previously called the Nanfan, is a horse breed native to the northwestern Tibetan plateau. Its ancestry traces to the Tang dynasty, influenced by the Tibetan pony, the Ferghana and the Mongolian horse. It was given its present name in 1954, from the Chinese word for its native region on the first loop of the Yellow River. Once common, the Hequ fell victim to Chinese policy and the mechanization of transportation.

It is divided into three types: the Jiaoke, the Suoke, and Kesheng. It has remarkable physiological adaptation, following strong pressure from natural selection, allowing them to live in hypoxic environments (in) the Tibetan plateau at altitudes of 4000 m. The Hequ shows great versatility, being present as at Tibetan local races for the religious use or herd management. The Chinese authorities are seeking to develop its livestock for meat. The breed remains common; thousands of these horses are still commonly found in areas of Maqu, Luqu and Xiahe.

== Nomenclature ==
The breed was officially named "Hequ" in 1954 by the Northwest Livestock Office of China, but locally there are other names such as "Tangke", "Qiaoke" and "Nanfan". Nafan was most often used in 1954. The name "Hequ" is a reference to the Chinese name of the first loop of the Yellow River, which forms the cradle of breed. Since 1954, only the official name is customary. In Russian, this horse is named "Khetsyui". It is often confused, wrongly, with the Tibetan pony.

== Characteristics ==
The Hequ is alternately described as a saddle horse and a light draft horse. It is a small horse measuring 1.30 to 1.50 metres (12.3 to 14.3 hands; 51 to 59 in), weighing 330 to 400 kilograms (730 to 880 lb), with good conformation. The head is of medium length, with a straight profile. Fine, it features very mobile eyes. The ears are long, wide and well open nostrils. The muzzle is small, and the neck is medium to short, thick, sloping and well connected to shoulders, which are well-sloped. The chest is broad and deep, the back tends to be long, and the croup is slightly sloping. The hoof is wide, but not as strong as it should. The most common dresses are black, bay and gray dress being united principle.

Mares mature at two years old and are able to reproduce at three. They can give birth to 12 or 13 foals in their lives. The fertility rate is 70%, but can go up to 80 or even 90% with appropriate care.

=== Types ===
Three varieties are distinguished in the breed: the Jiaoke (or Jiaode), the Suoke and Kesheng. The Jiaoke is from Southern Gansu, it is the heaviest variety. The head is broader and it sometimes has hoof soundness problems. The predominant color is gray. The Suoke comes from western Sichuan. The head is broad and coupling is short. They carry their tails high, similar to art from the Tang dynasty. The Kesheng comes from the Kesheng Autonomous Region. It is further influenced by the Mongolian horse.

=== Temperament and maintenance ===
The Hequ is particularly rustic. High at elevations ranging from 3000 to 5000 meters, it supports low temperatures, snowfall seven months of the year and rain during the summer. He quickly gains weight in summer, and loses its fat slower fall and winter than other horses. Its adaptation to extreme environmental conditions was the subject of an analysis published in PLOS ONE, concluding that it probably comes from a long evolution that favored the ability to handle low oxygen. This has made the Hequ suited to hypoxic environments (in). It thus has significant genetic and morphological differences from the horses lower altitudes. A study at the University of Gansu (published only in Chinese) reaches the same conclusion: the cold and low oxygen levels cause a visible physiological adaptation, particularly in terms of size, chest width and color skin.

In 2000, the composition of the pastures frequented the horses were analyzed, especially their mineral content and composition of blood Hequ. The results indicate that the levels of selenium and zinc are significantly inferior to the standard nutritional requirements of other breeds of horses.

=== Breeding and genetics ===
The Hequ is considered one of the seven major Chinese groups of horses. They are considered by the Chinese to be a superior type of horse, including its size, higher than that of most of China's native horses. This breed is the subject of a selection in several breeding centers, to improve it.

A study published in the Journal of Heredity has determined the breed to be a part of the Qinghai horse group of the Tibetan plateau, which is part Hequ with Chaidamu, Datong and Yushu. It has the lowest number of alleles (6.74) among the 28 breeds studied for the purposes of a comparison between Chinese horses, published in Animal Genetics. Six haplotypes were identified in horses Gansu. Cluster E is only present in the Hequ, which probably has the same origin as the Qilian mother horse. This study published in the Journal of Agricultural Biotechnology concluded (2014) that it is potentially a descendant of the Przewalski horse. Another study focused on the composition of testicular fibroblast Hequ standards (in 2012), showing that "the horse is Hequ a major national genetic resource stored at the cellular level, which will provide an ideal experimental material for genetic studies."

== History ==
The Hequ originates from the time of the Tang dynasty. It is most often used to mount war. The Emperor ordered the creation of a stud farm to breed cavalry mounts. Many horses are imported from West Asia and crossed with local animals. The Hequ is strongly influenced by the horse called "Dawan," which seems to be the same as the Ferghana horse. In the Yuan Dynasty, the Hequ is crossed with the mounts of Mongol tribe Xianbei, which invade the current province of Qinghai. In the nineteenth century the Hequ is imported from southern Qinghai to the north of that province to be crossed with the Datong to improve it. From 1934, some Hequ crossed to give the Shandan race.

During the census in 1980, the Hequ is one of the most common breeds of horses on the territory of China, with 180 000 head. However, the census FAO gives a different figure of around 60 000 head in 1982. In the early 1990s, Chinese researchers discuss measures to technically control the breeding of horses Hequ, so set a retention region and selecting a reference herd.

This breed is considered in decline since the late twentieth century. The major cause of this decline is related to the local Chinese policy, which instead encourages the breeding of sheep and yak. The other reason is to be found in the modernization of transport modes, young farmers and shepherds opting more often for a motorcycle or a moped to get around, to the detriment of the horse. In 2005, a quick survey of older Tibetans reveals they regret these changes, and fear that the horse will eventually disappear completely.

== Uses ==
The Hequ is very versatile, its ability to cross the mountainous areas and wetlands is recognized. It is mainly used for light-draft work and mounted by Tibetan mountain shepherds, although the latter use is scarce. Sometimes it is saddled or harnessed for transportation and agricultural work. Its traction abilities are quite good, with a strong capacity for endurance. However, speed is moderate. They recover quickly after exercise.

=== Racing and traditional uses ===
The Hequ remains associated with a religious and folk use to carry the reincarnated lama, or to participate in local horse racing. Maqu races are especially popular and attract hundreds of thousands of spectators came to see the riders compete in the region. These are endurance races, carried over distances ranging from 1 to 10 km. This horse is now valued in the context of tourism, the use of Hequ being considered deeply rooted in Tibetan culture. Some Tibetan herders have their horse as their "best friend".

=== Meat production ===
Several Chinese studies begun in 1989 and published in 1993 in the Journal of Gansu Agricultural University focused on the suitability of the breed for meat production. Among horses present in China, the Hequ is one of those with the best qualities for this purpose, the average percentage of recovered meat on the carcass being 79.42%. By its general appearance, Hequ has a conformation close to the desired kind on the market, including an elongated body, bones thin and has a layer of fat under the skin during the cold season. Chinese researchers believe necessary to select meat lines among this breed. The analysis of the composition of meat Hequ focused on its nutritional value, which is characterized by a high protein content (22.8%) and a very low fat (4.96%). The study adds that ethnic customs recede (and with them the traditional uses of this breed), and the breeding of horses for meat "is not accepted by the masses."

== Dissemination of livestock ==
The Hequ is considered by the study from the University of Uppsala (2010) as a local breed which is not endangered. According to the FAO assessment conducted in 2007, this horse is common.

Considered one of the native breeds of China and very famous in all countries, its breed cradle yet situated in a culturally Tibetan region, northwest of the Tibetan plateau, just near the first loop of the Yellow River at the crossroads of the provinces of Qinghai, Sichuan and Gansu. The population of Hequ has been eroded in the early twenty-first century, the number of horses being estimated to be in the range between 16 000 and 50 000 head. This horse is still found quite commonly in Maqu xian, who would conceal about 30 000 in 2012. It is also common in Xiahe xian and Luqu.
