= Battle of Beran Byrig =

556 battle between West Saxons and Britons

Coordinates: 51.485458°N 1.786808°W

- Part of the Anglo-Saxon settlement of Britain
Date	c. 556
Location	Barbury Castle, Wiltshire
Result	Saxon victory

Belligerents
West Saxons	Britons

Commanders and leaders
Cynric; Ceawlin	

At the Battle of Beran Byrig or Beranburh the West Saxons are said to have defeated the Britons at Barbury Castle hillfort near Swindon in or around 556 AD according to the Anglo-Saxon Chronicle.

The Chronicle's entry for the year states:

556: Her Cynric 7 Ceawlin fuhton wiþ Brettas æt Beranbyrg
556: This year Cynric and Ceawlin fought with the Britons at Beran byrg.

The control of Barbury Castle and its surroundings is likely to have been strategically important for both sides, as it lies on the Ridgeway, a principal regional communication route.
