= Berkshire Downs =

Chalk hills in England

- Lambourn Downs
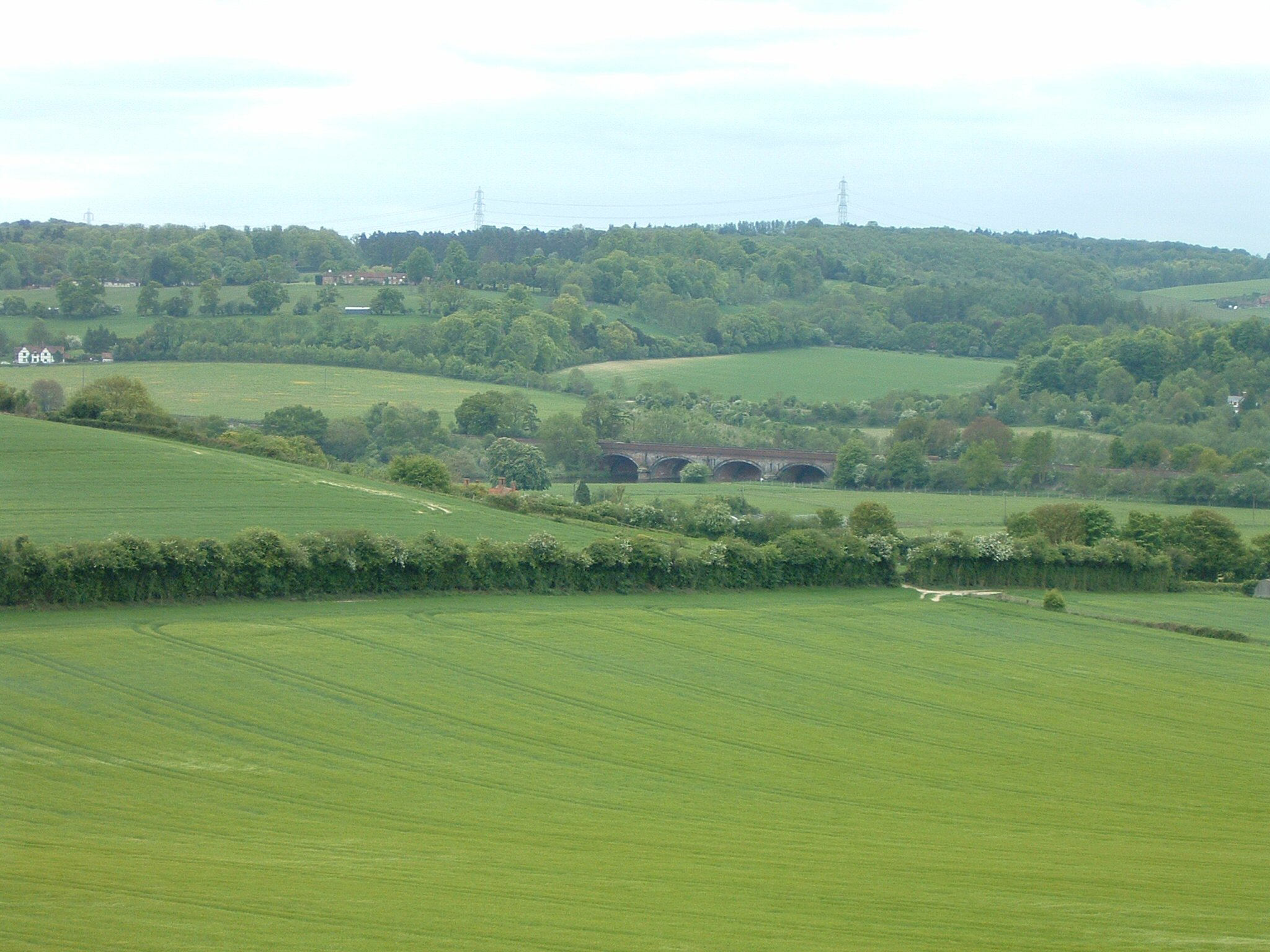
- The Downs near Goring-on-Thames
- Interactive map of Berkshire Downs
- Location: England
- Coordinates: 51.575°N 1.570°W

The Berkshire Downs are a range of chalk downland hills in southern England, part of the North Wessex Downs Area of Outstanding Natural Beauty. The Berkshire Downs are wholly within the traditional county of Berkshire, although split between the current ceremonial counties of Berkshire and Oxfordshire. The western parts of the downs are also known as the Lambourn Downs.

== Geography ==
The Berkshire Downs run east–west, with their scarp slope facing north into the Vale of White Horse and their dip slope bounded by the course of the River Kennet. Geologically they are continuous with the Marlborough Downs to the west and the Chilterns to the east. In the east they are divided from the Chilterns by Goring Gap on the River Thames. In the west their boundary is generally taken to be the border between Berkshire and Wiltshire, although the downs in Wiltshire between the Berkshire border and the valley of the River Og are sometimes considered to be part of the Berkshire Downs. The Berkshire and Marlborough Downs together form one of Natural England's National Character Areas.

== History ==
English downland has attracted human habitation since prehistoric times. The ancient track known as the Ridgeway runs along the Berkshire Downs. Prehistoric sites in the Downs include Wayland's Smithy (Neolithic), numerous tumuli (Neolithic or Bronze Age), Uffington White Horse (Bronze Age), Liddington Castle and Uffington Castle (Bronze Age and Iron Age), and Segsbury Camp and Grim's Ditch (Iron Age).

It is generally thought that in Anglo-Saxon times the downs were known as Æscesdūn or Ashdown, and that it was here that the Battle of Ashdown was fought in 871.

By the middle ages, the downs were famous for their huge flocks of sheep, providing wool and fertiliser for the lower-lying arable land with their manure to support the local corn production. From the 15th and 16th centuries, the downs saw the rise of a new type of large-scale, capitalist farming. Farmers began to expand their landholdings by taking over large institutional estates and absorbing smaller farms, leading to the creation of some of the country's largest farms. This trend of farm enlargement continued from the late 18th century and again after 1950, resulting in some exceptionally large farmsteads that stand out even in a national context. The average farm size in this area is now larger than in other chalk downland landscapes.

In 1915, after a brief stint as a hospital orderly at the British hospital for French soldiers in Haute-Marne, John Masefield moved to his country retreat at Lollingdon Farm. The setting at the foot of the Downs - Masefield's "Lollingdon Downs" would inspire a number of poems and sonnets.

== Economy ==
Downland pasture is firm and well drained, suited to grazing sheep and grazing and training horses. Starting in the 19th century, horse racing became a major business in the area, with much of the downs covered with training areas, and stables centred on the village of Lambourn.

== Railway links ==
The Berkshire Downs can be accessed from various cities via the Great Western Main Line and its current single operator runs localised stopping trains as well as the high-speed trains along the Vale of White Horse calling at major stops Swindon and Didcot Parkway. From Reading to Newbury trains run along the Reading to Taunton Line in the River Kennet Valley to reach Devon on the quickest route from London. From Reading there are the scenic Thames Valley stations of Pangbourne, Goring & Streatley and Cholsey (linked to the Cholsey and Wallingford Railway).

== Conservation ==
Due to its natural beauty and special scenic qualities, the majority of the Berkshire Downs (97%) is included in the North Wessex Downs Area of Outstanding Natural Beauty.

== Gallery ==
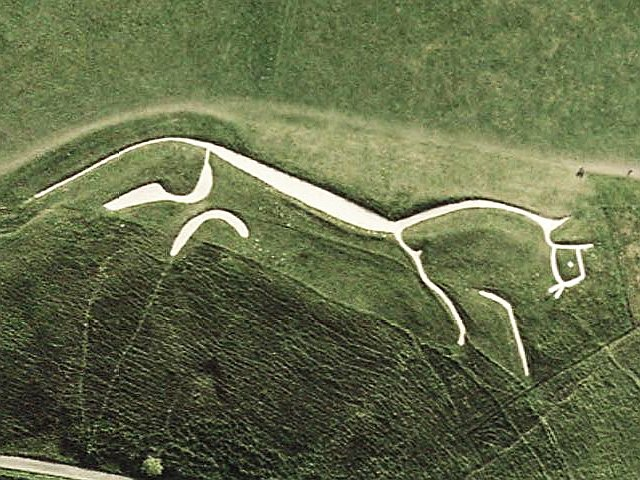
Uffington White Horse, a prehistoric hill figure on the Berkshire Downs near Uffington, Oxfordshire

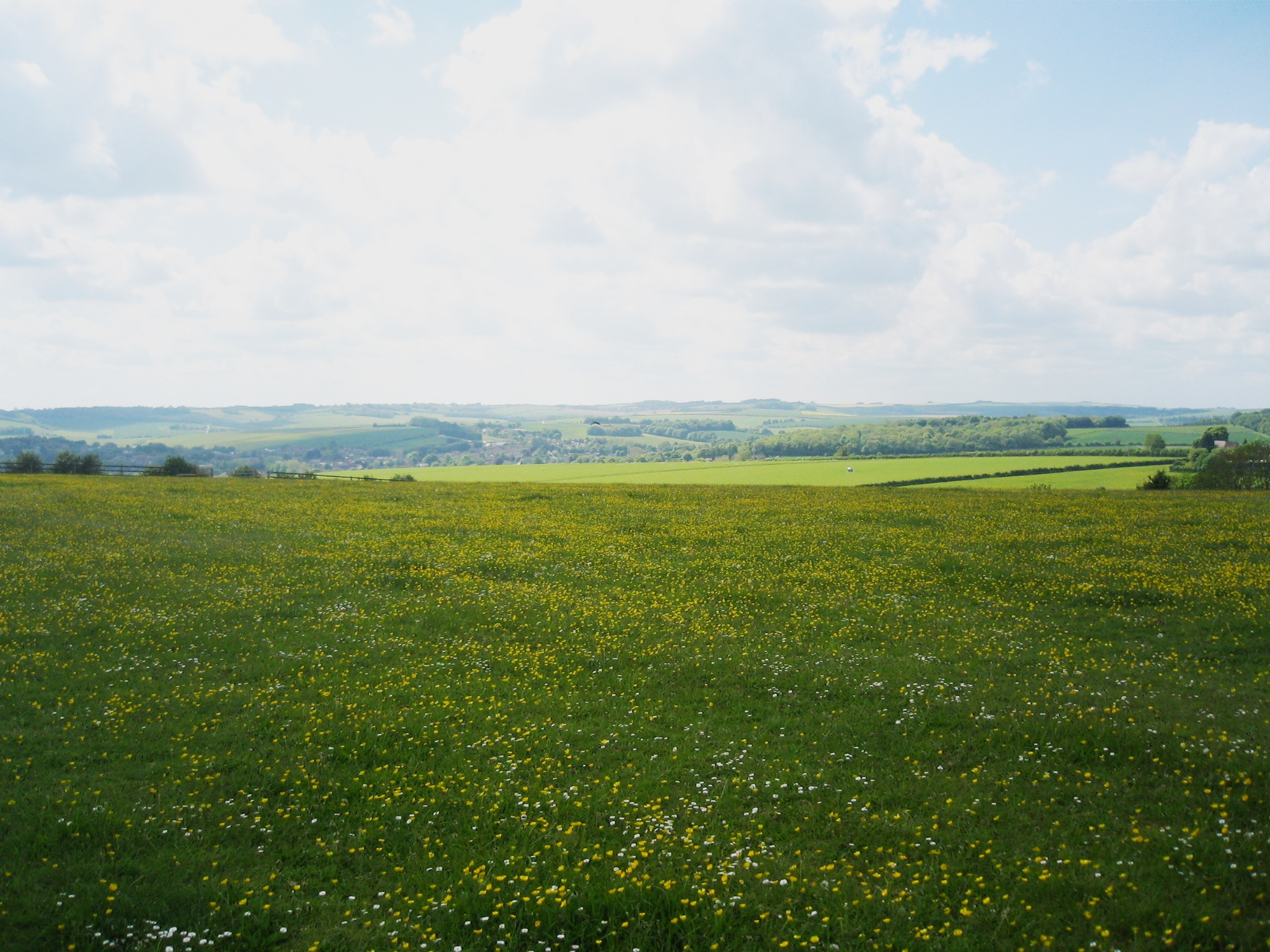
Eastbury Down, Eastbury

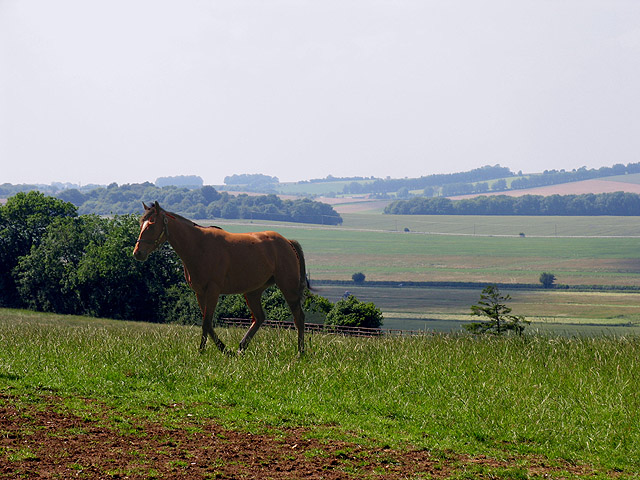
Racehorse on farmland in Lambourn

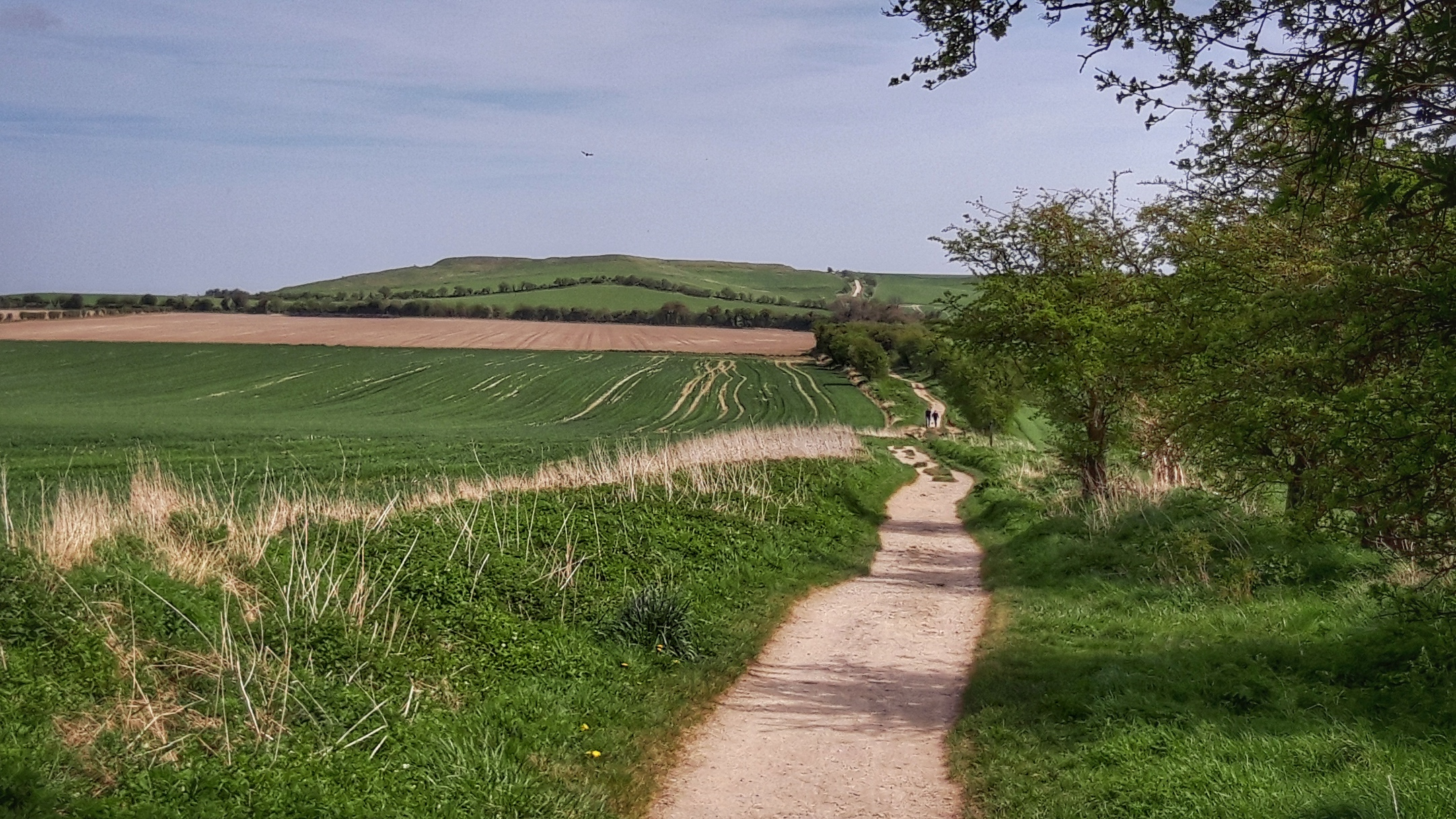
The Ridgeway approaching Whitehorse Hill, the highest point on the Berkshire Downs
