= Barbury Castle =

Hillfort in Wiltshire, England

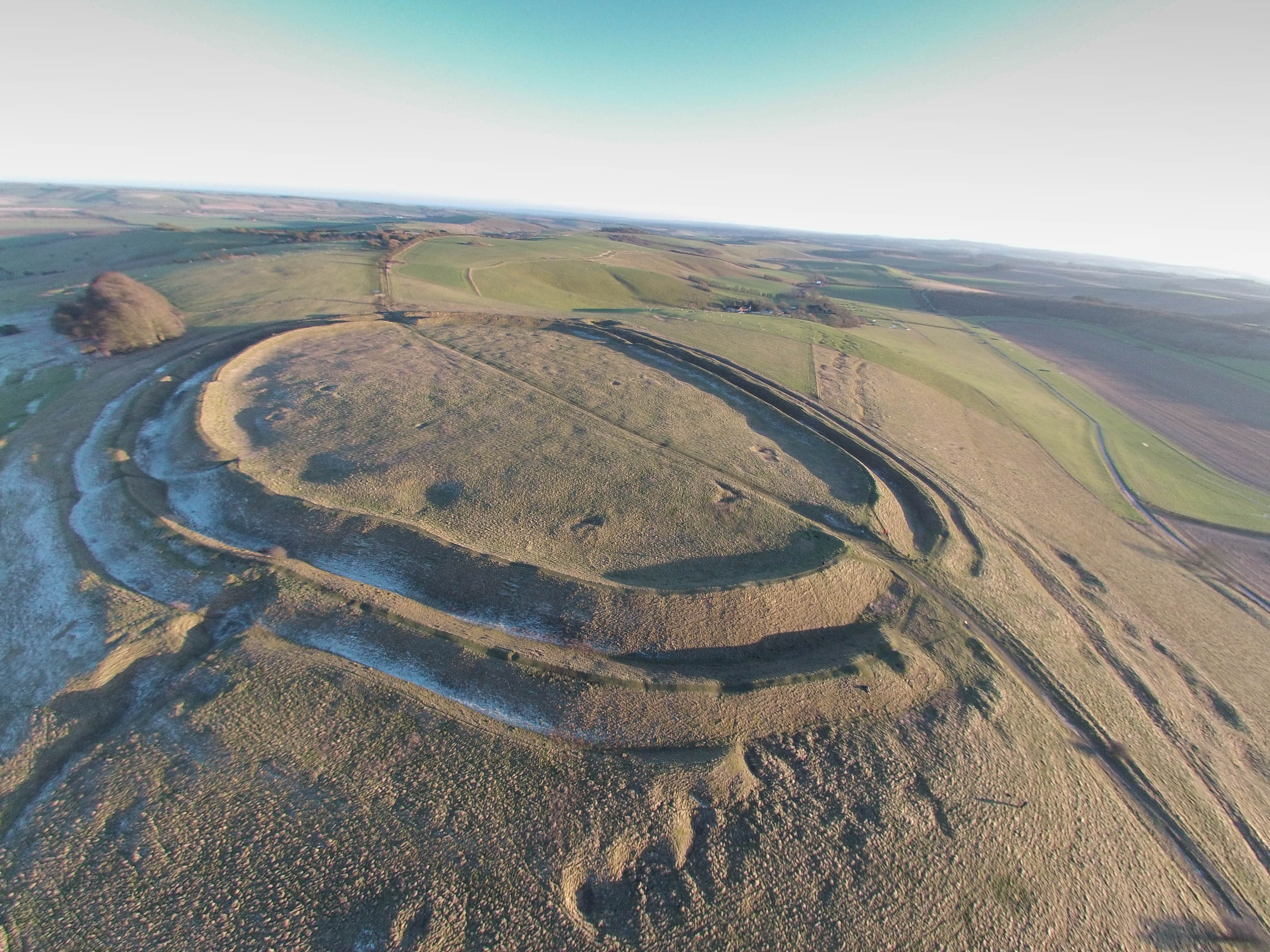
- Aerial view of Barbury Castle

- Location within Wiltshire
- 51.4853°N 1.7865°W
- Type: Hillfort
- Periods: Iron Age
- Location: Wiltshire

Site notes
- Area: 12 acres (4.9 ha)
- Public access: yes, The Ridgeway

Scheduled monument
- Official name: Barbury Castle: a hillfort and bowl barrow
- Designated: 18 August 1882
- Reference no.: 1014557

Barbury Castle is a scheduled hillfort in Wiltshire, England, about 5.5 miles (9 km) south of Swindon.

== Description ==
Barbury is one of several such forts found along the ancient Ridgeway route. The site, which lies within the Wessex Downs Area of Outstanding Natural Beauty, has been managed as a country park by Swindon Borough Council since 1971. It is on Barbury Hill, a local vantage point, which, under ideal weather conditions, commands a view across to the Cotswolds and the River Severn. It has two deep defensive ditches and ramparts.

The site spans two civil parishes: Ogbourne St Andrew (to the south, in Wiltshire) and Wroughton (in the Borough of Swindon).

== History ==
Hillforts date from the late Iron Age. Barbury was in use during the Roman occupation of the area, and archaeological investigations have shown evidence of a number of buildings, indicating a village or military garrison at this time.

In the 6th century the site became part of the Saxon kingdom of Wessex, following the defeat of the Romano-British at the Battle of Beranburgh, Beran Byrig or Beranbyrig in AD 556. Centuries later the area was a favourite haunt of the 19th-century writer Richard Jefferies, who lived an hour's walk away at Coate. The site was designated as a scheduled monument in 1882.

In World War II the War Ministry appropriated the site for US Army Air Force anti-aircraft guns; the bases for these are apparently visible as hollows around the edge of the fort interior.

In 1996, a geophysical survey revealed traces of 40 hut circles inside the castle. A reconstruction of an Iron Age roundhouse was built on the site in 2006 but was destroyed by vandals in October 2008.

In 2009, English Heritage (now Historic England) carried out a National Mapping Programme project which comprised an interpretation, transcription and analysis of all archaeological features visible on aerial photographs in the environs of Barbury Castle.

== Location ==
Barbury Castle is at grid reference SU149762, about 5 miles (8 km) south of Swindon and the M4, on the northern edge of the Marlborough Downs within the North Wessex Downs Area of Outstanding Natural Beauty. The site is close to the Ridgeway long-distance footpath, which runs east–west along the edge of the downs. In the surrounding area there are round barrows, Celtic field systems and 18th-19th century flint workings.

== Gallery ==
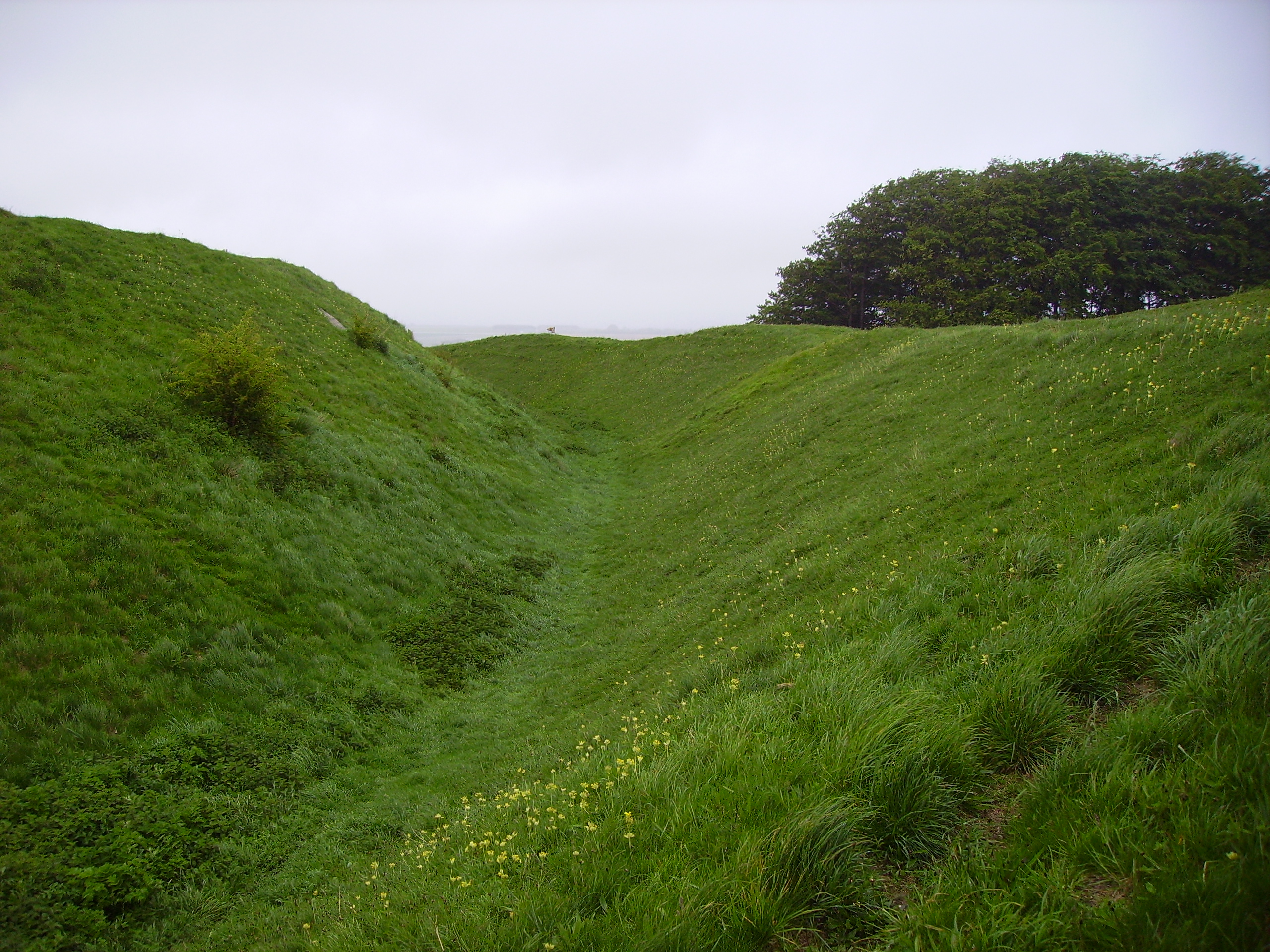
Steep earthworks, looking northwards

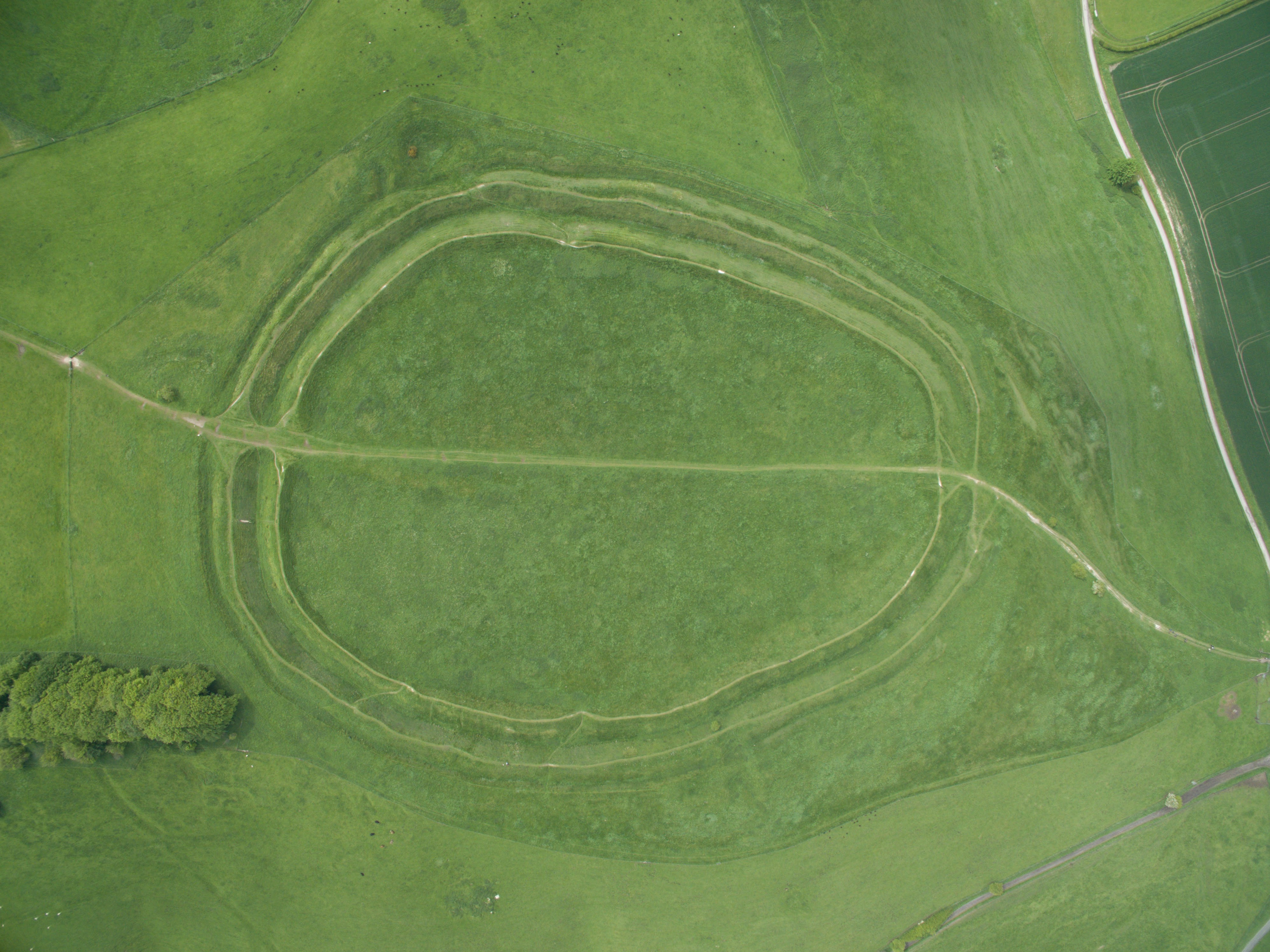
Aerial view

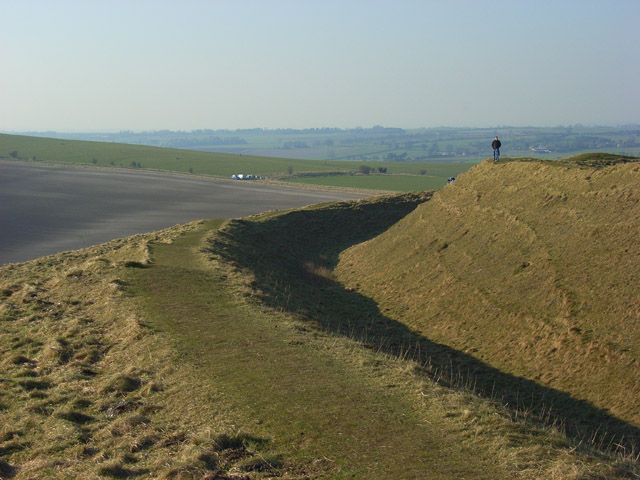
Barbury Castle showing the scale of the present-day structure

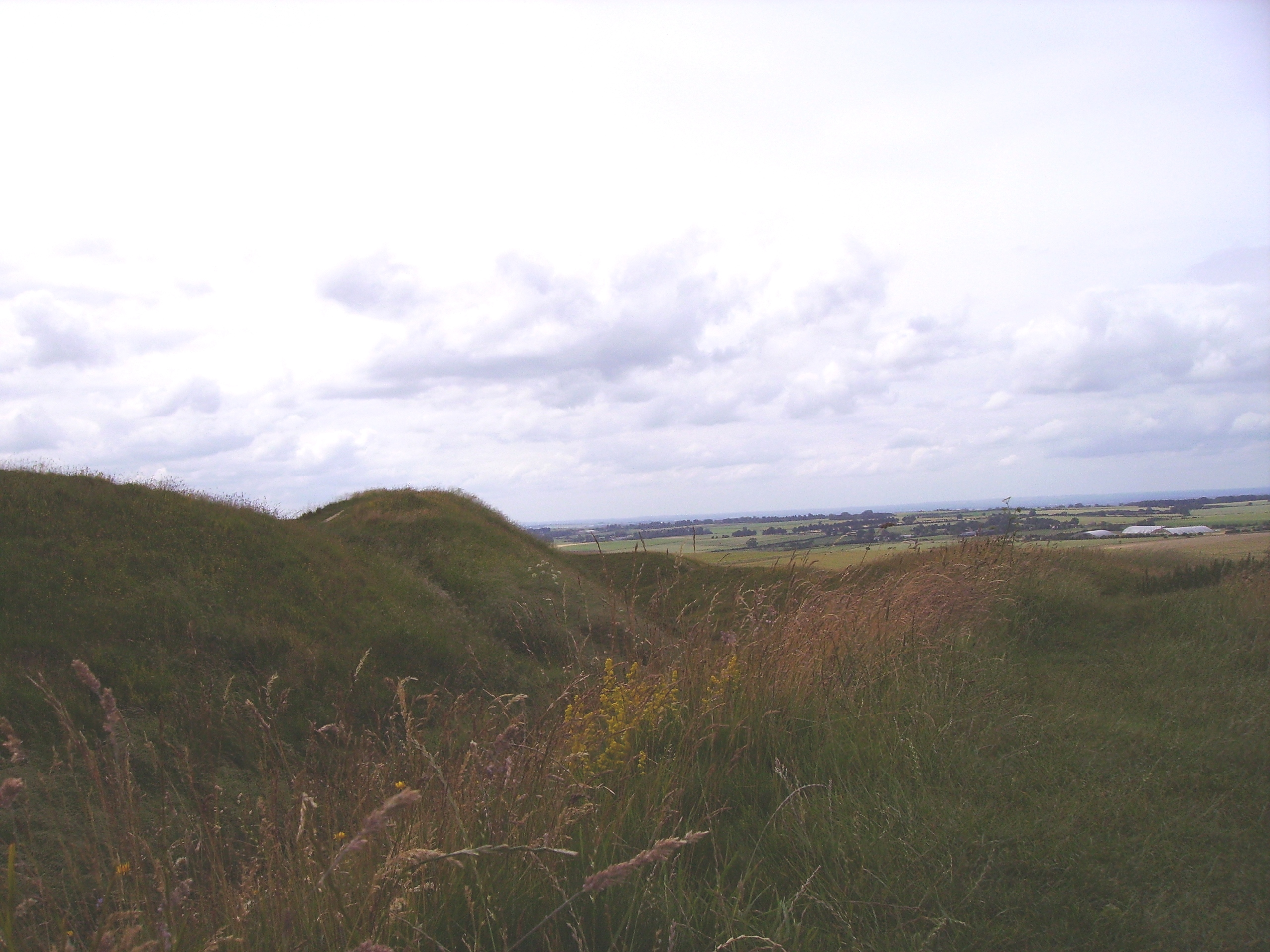
Looking westwards towards the River Severn

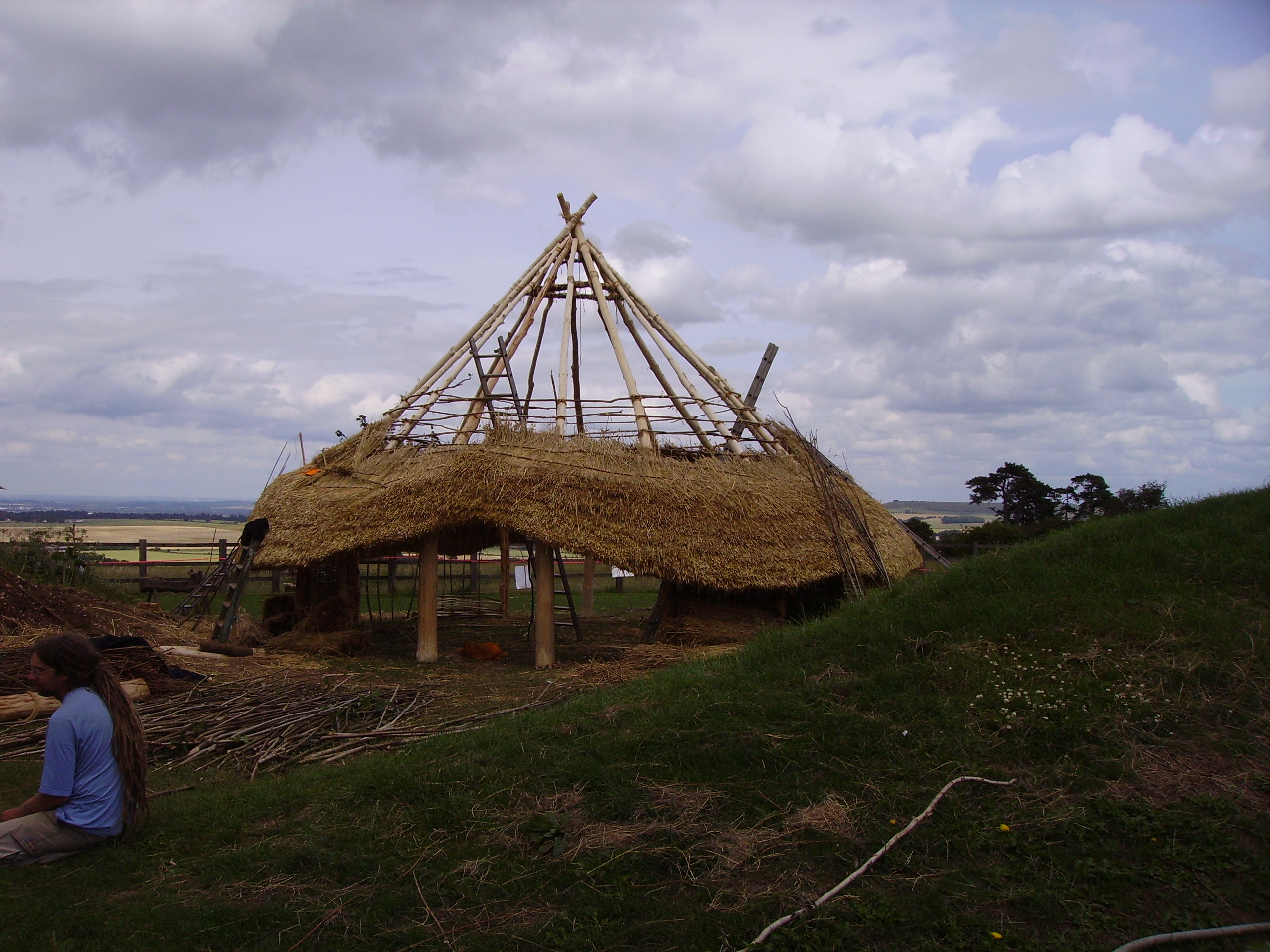
The Iron Age house under construction, July 2006

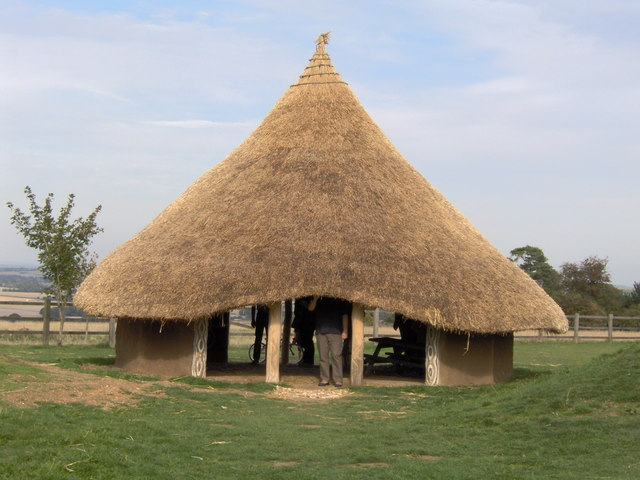
Iron-Age roundhouse reconstruction

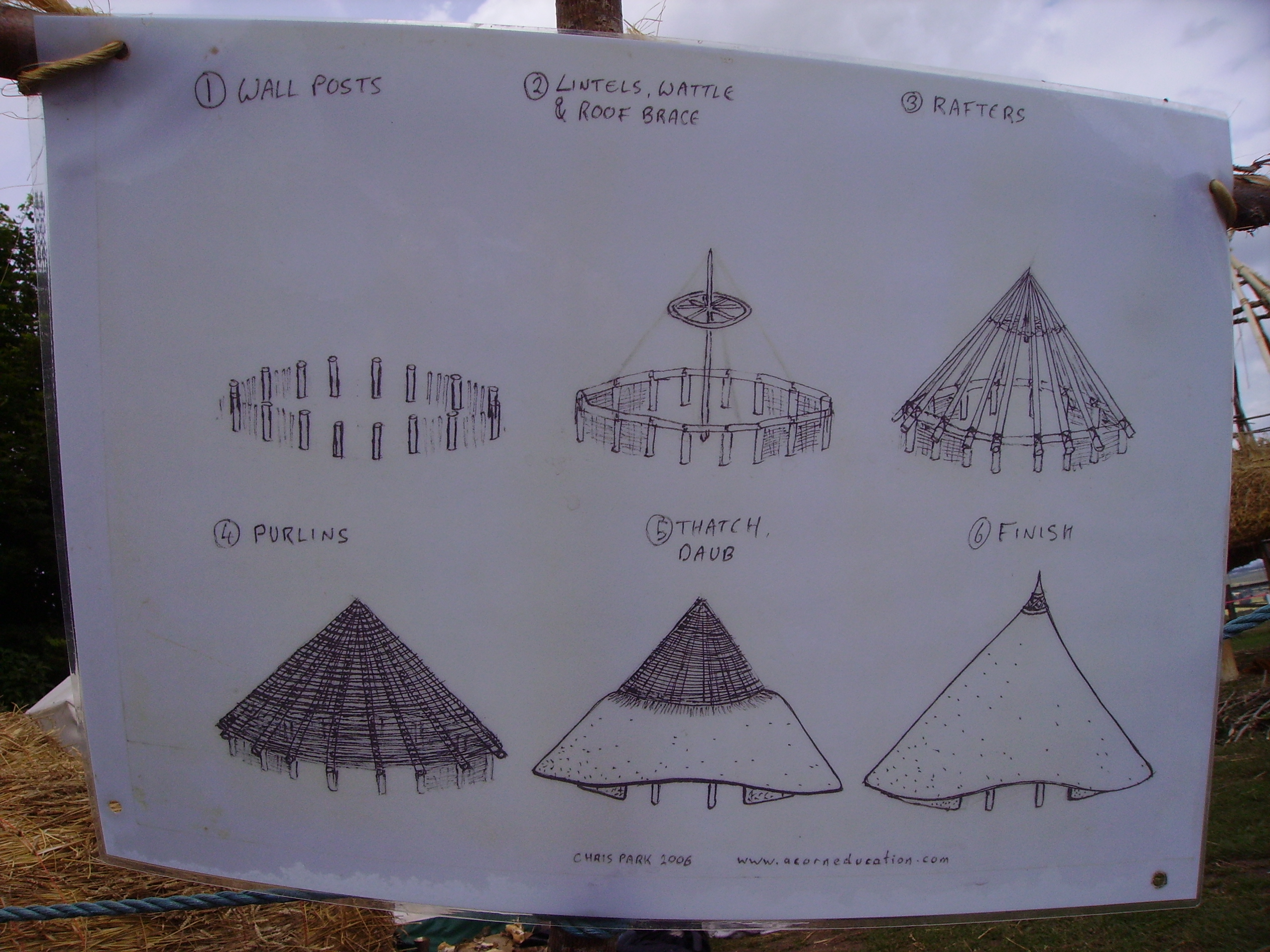
Plans of the Iron Age house

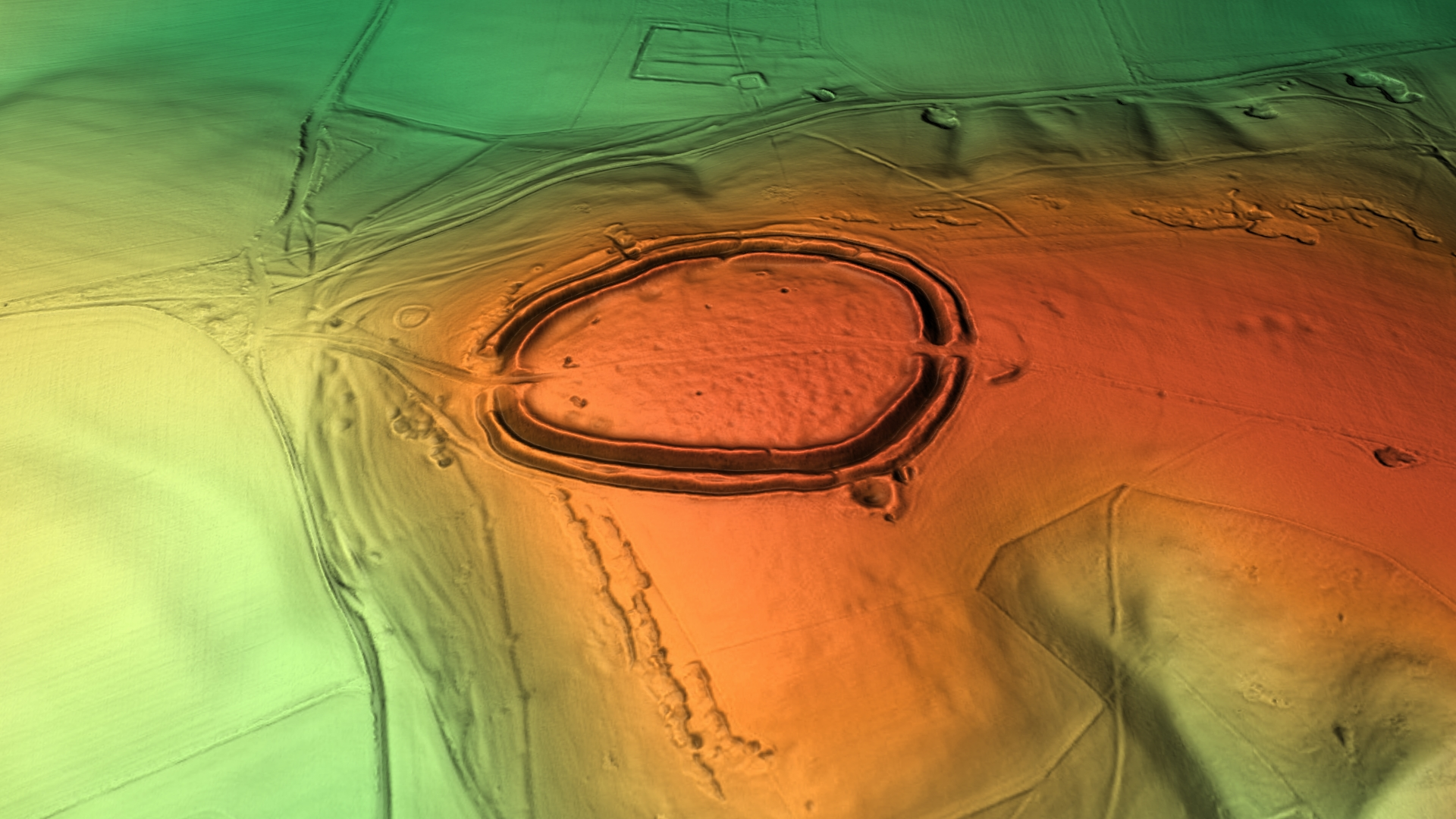
2021 Digital terrain model of the area

== See also ==
- List of hillforts in England
- List of hillforts in Scotland
- List of hillforts in Wales
