= Segsbury Camp =

- Letcombe Castle
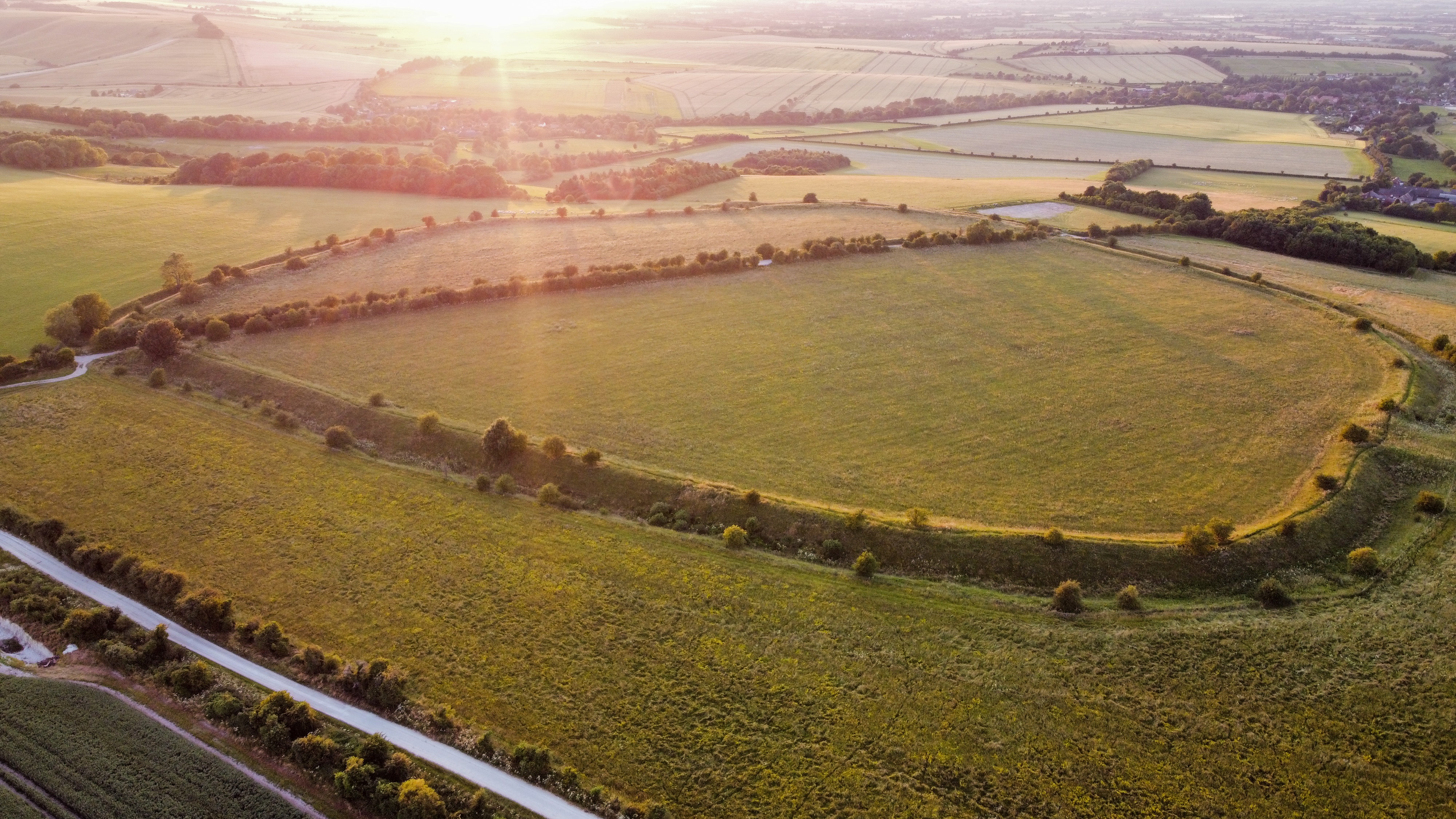
- Segsbury Camp see from above, looking west

- Location within Oxfordshire
- 51°33′29″N 1°26′46″W
- Type: Iron age hillfort
- Location: Letcombe Regis, Wantage, Oxfordshire
- OS grid reference: SU385845

Scheduled monument
- Official name: Segsbury Camp or Letcombe Castle hillfort
- Designated: 9 May 1935
- Reference no.: 1017717

Segsbury Camp or Segsbury Castle is an Iron Age hillfort on the crest of the Berkshire Downs, near the Ridgeway above Wantage, in the Vale of White Horse district of Oxfordshire, England. It is in Letcombe Regis civil parish and is also called Letcombe Castle.

The fort has extensive ditch and ramparts and four gateways. Excavation at the site by Dr Phené in 1871 discovered a cist grave on the south side of the hillfort rampart. The grave was floored with stone slabs and the sides were walled with flint. Finds included a shield boss and fragments of an urn or drinking cup. Among other finds were human bones and flint scrapers. It has been suggested that this was a secondary Anglo-Saxon burial, placed at the camp. Further excavation was carried out in 1996 and 1997. The report on this work describes the periodic occupation of the hillfort between the 6th and 2nd centuries BC and suggests that it was a communal centre for various activities, including sheep management and exchange.

== Location ==
The site is at Ordnance Survey six-figure grid reference SU385845.

== Image gallery ==
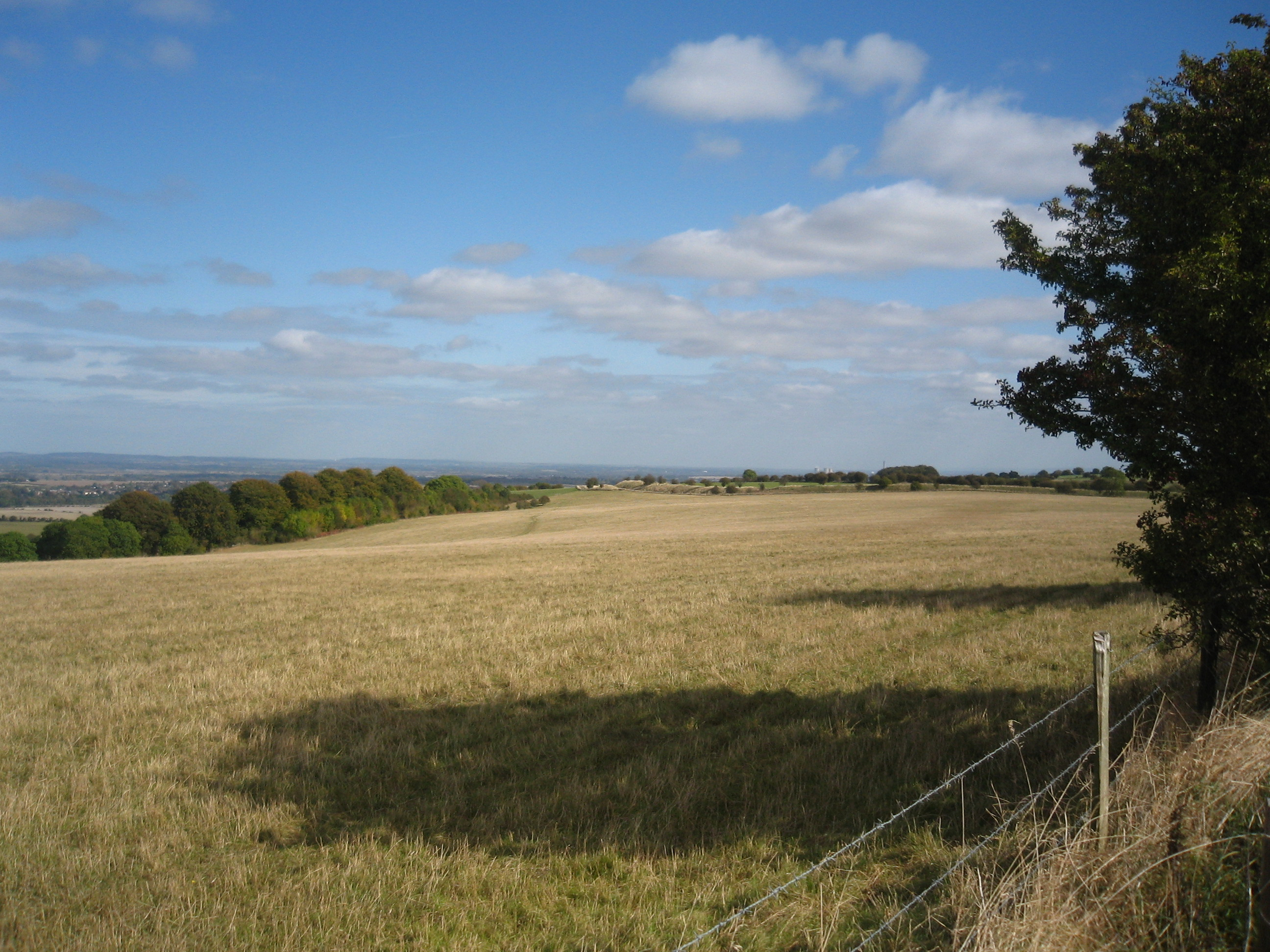
Segsbury Camp seen from the west from The Ridgeway

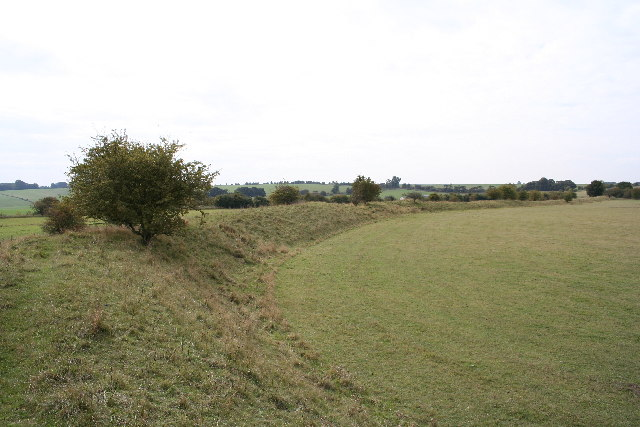
Segsbury Camp earthworks

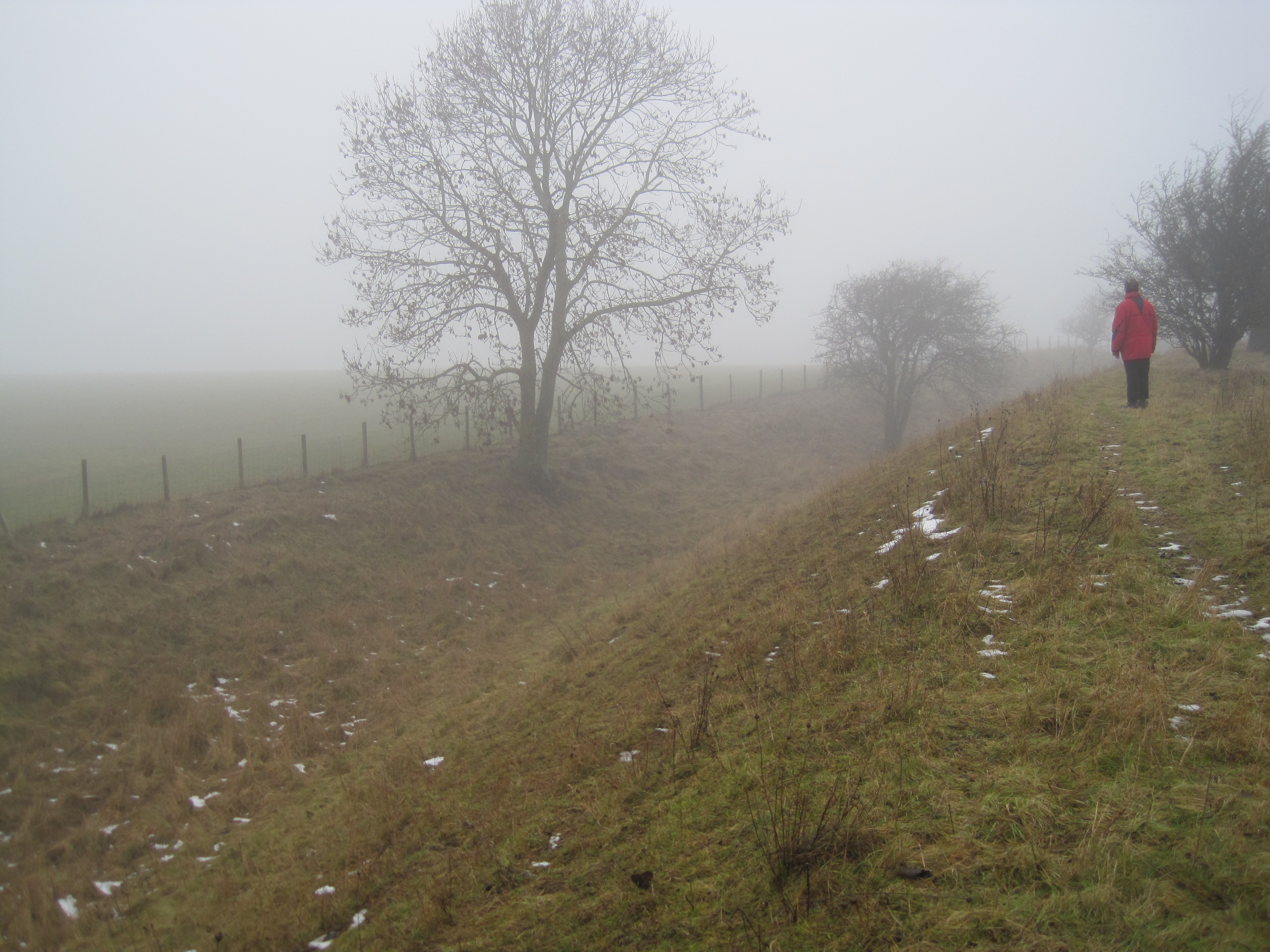
Segsbury Camp ditch

== Bibliography ==
Lock, G., Gosden, C. and Daly, P. 2005, Segsbury Camp: Excavations in 1996 and 1997 at an Iron Age hillfort on the Oxfordshire Ridgeway, Oxford University School of Archaeology, Monograph 61
