= The Ridgeway =

Ancient trackway described as Britain's oldest road

Coordinates: 51°33.8′N 1°21′W

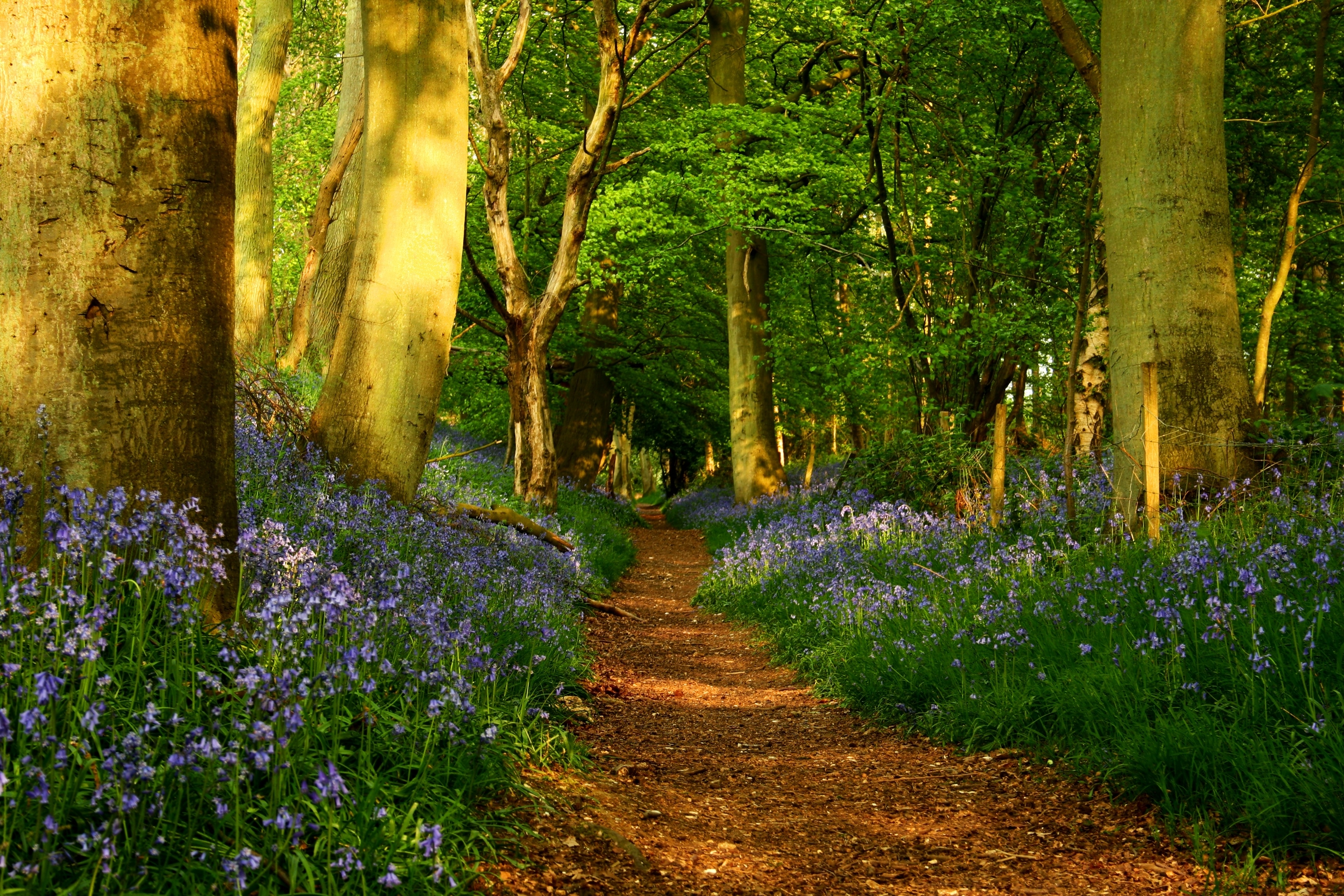
- The Ridgeway National Trail on Grim's Ditch near Mongewell
- Length: 87 mi (140 km)
- Location: southern England
- Designation: UK National Trail
- Trailheads: Overton Hill, near Avebury, Wiltshire and Ivinghoe Beacon, Buckinghamshire
- Use: Hiking
- Elevation change: 3,881 feet (1,183 m)
- Season: All year

Trail map
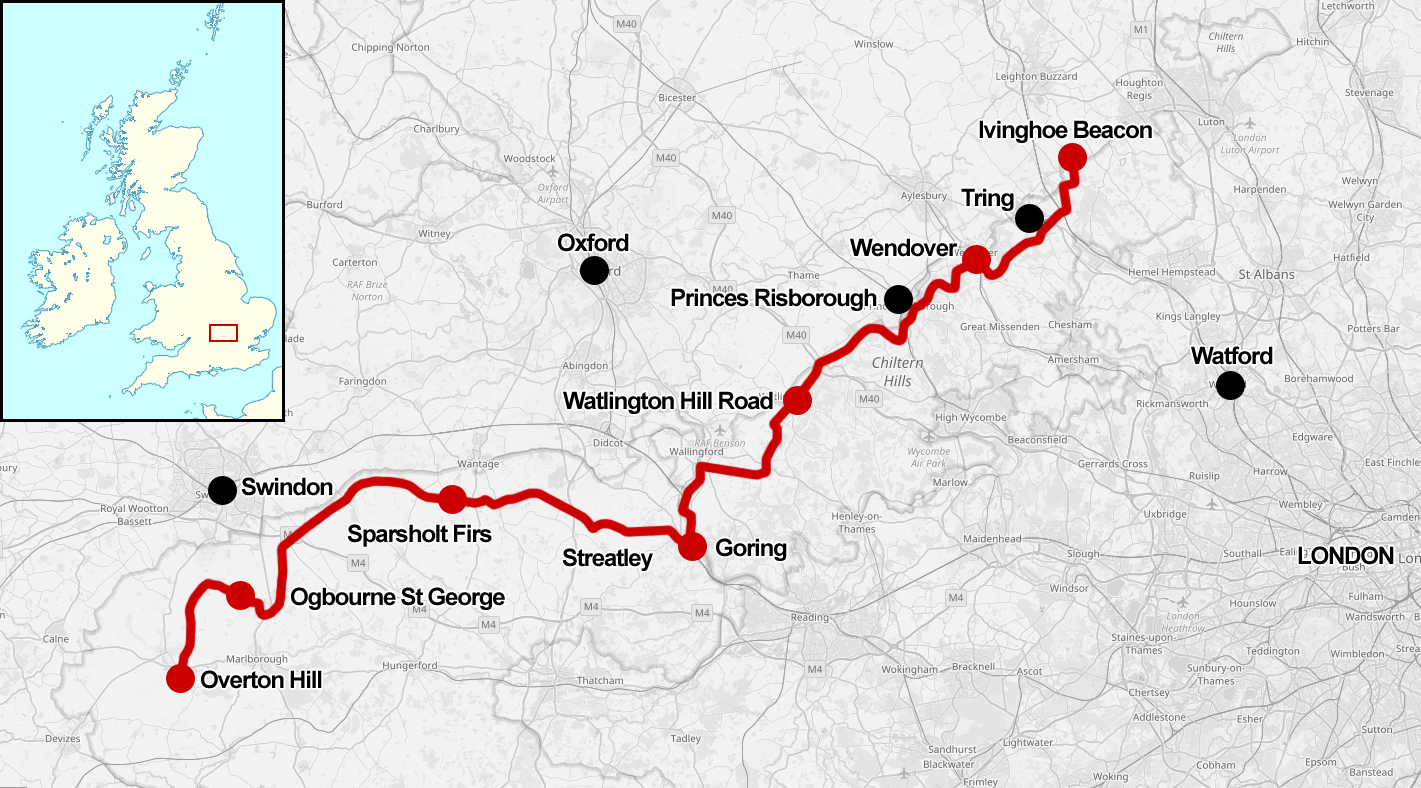
- Map of the Ridgeway National Trail in the south of England

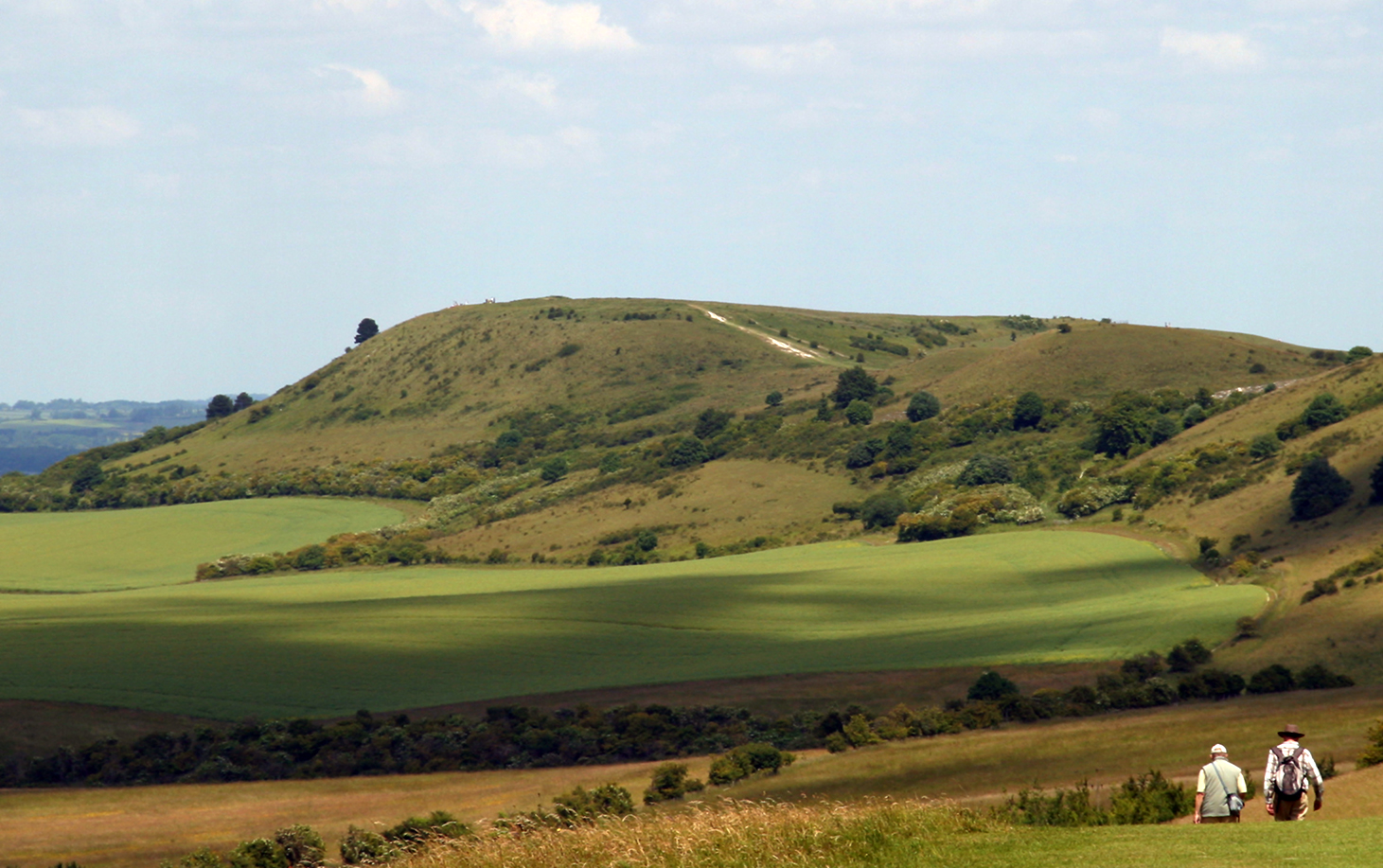
Ivinghoe Beacon (the eastern trailhead) seen looking north from The Ridgeway

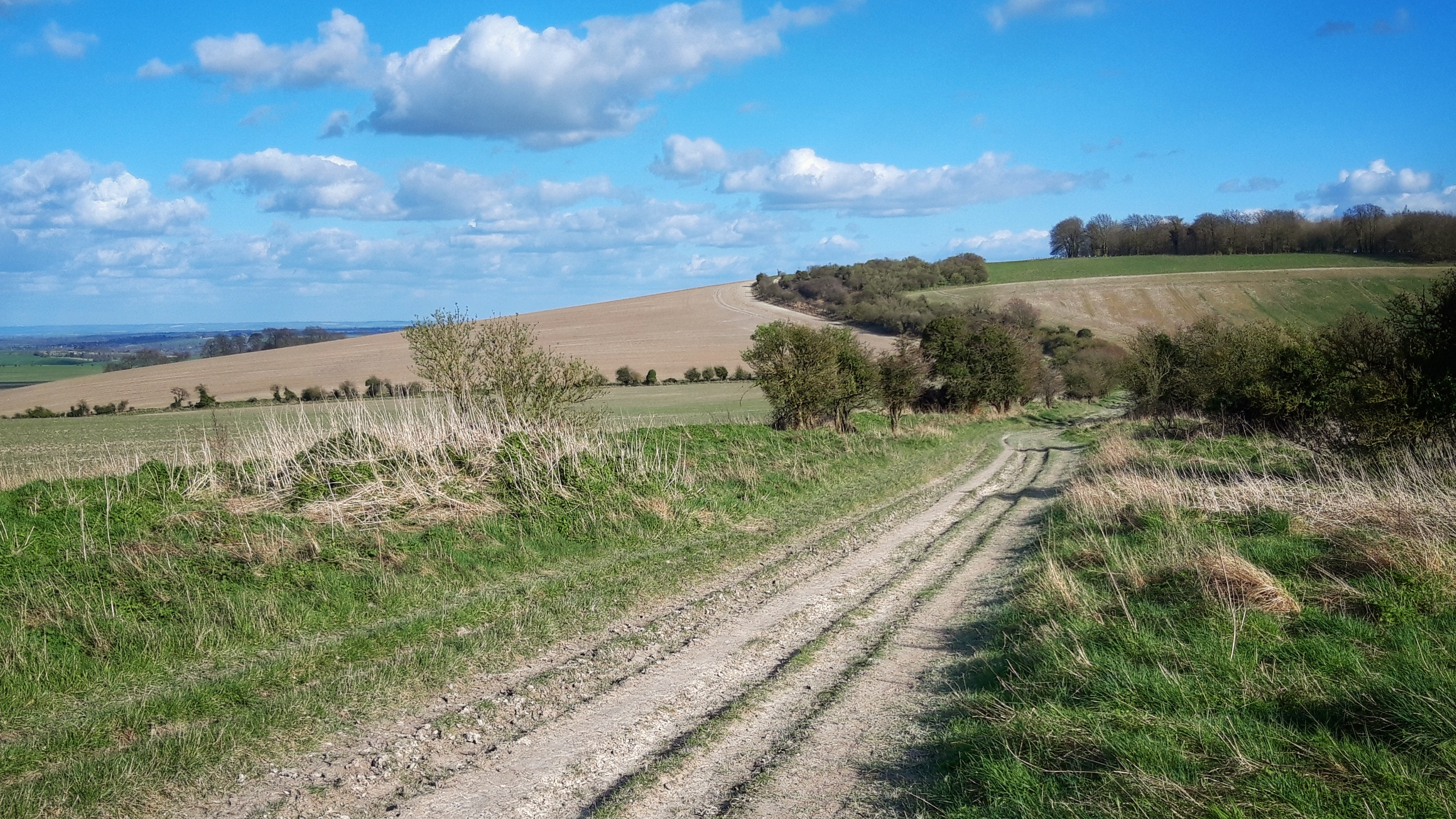
The Ridgeway winds over the Berkshire Downs

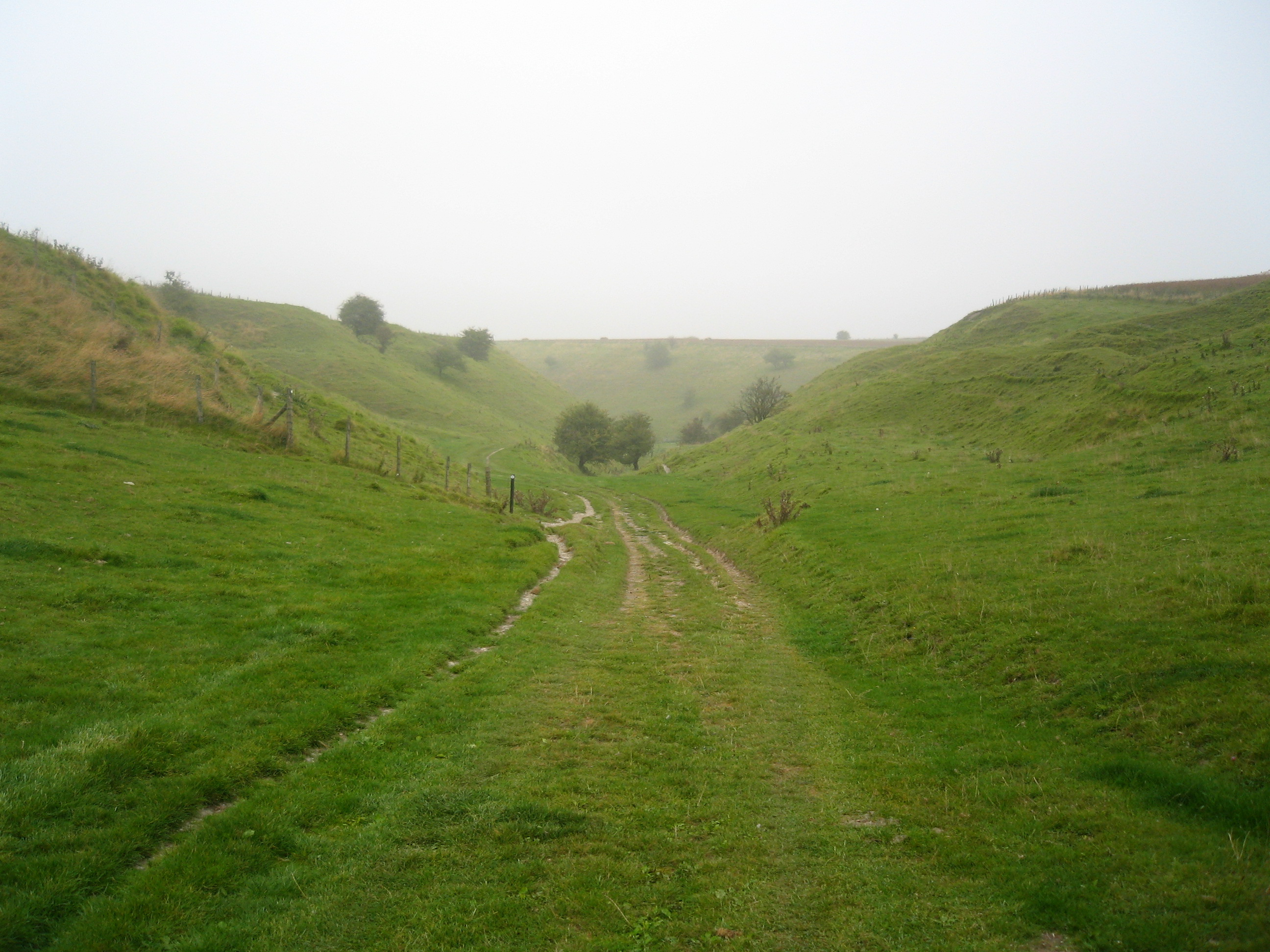
Path down from the Ridgeway to Bishopstone, Wiltshire

The Ridgeway is a ridgeway or ancient trackway described as Britain's oldest road. The section clearly identified as an ancient trackway extends from Wiltshire along the chalk ridge of the Berkshire Downs to the River Thames at the Goring Gap, part of the Icknield Way which ran, not always on the ridge, from Salisbury Plain to East Anglia. The route was adapted and extended as a National Trail, created in 1972. The Ridgeway National Trail follows the ancient Ridgeway from Overton Hill, near Avebury, to Streatley, then follows footpaths and parts of the ancient Icknield Way through the Chiltern Hills to Ivinghoe Beacon in Buckinghamshire. The National Trail is 87 miles (140 km) long.

== History ==
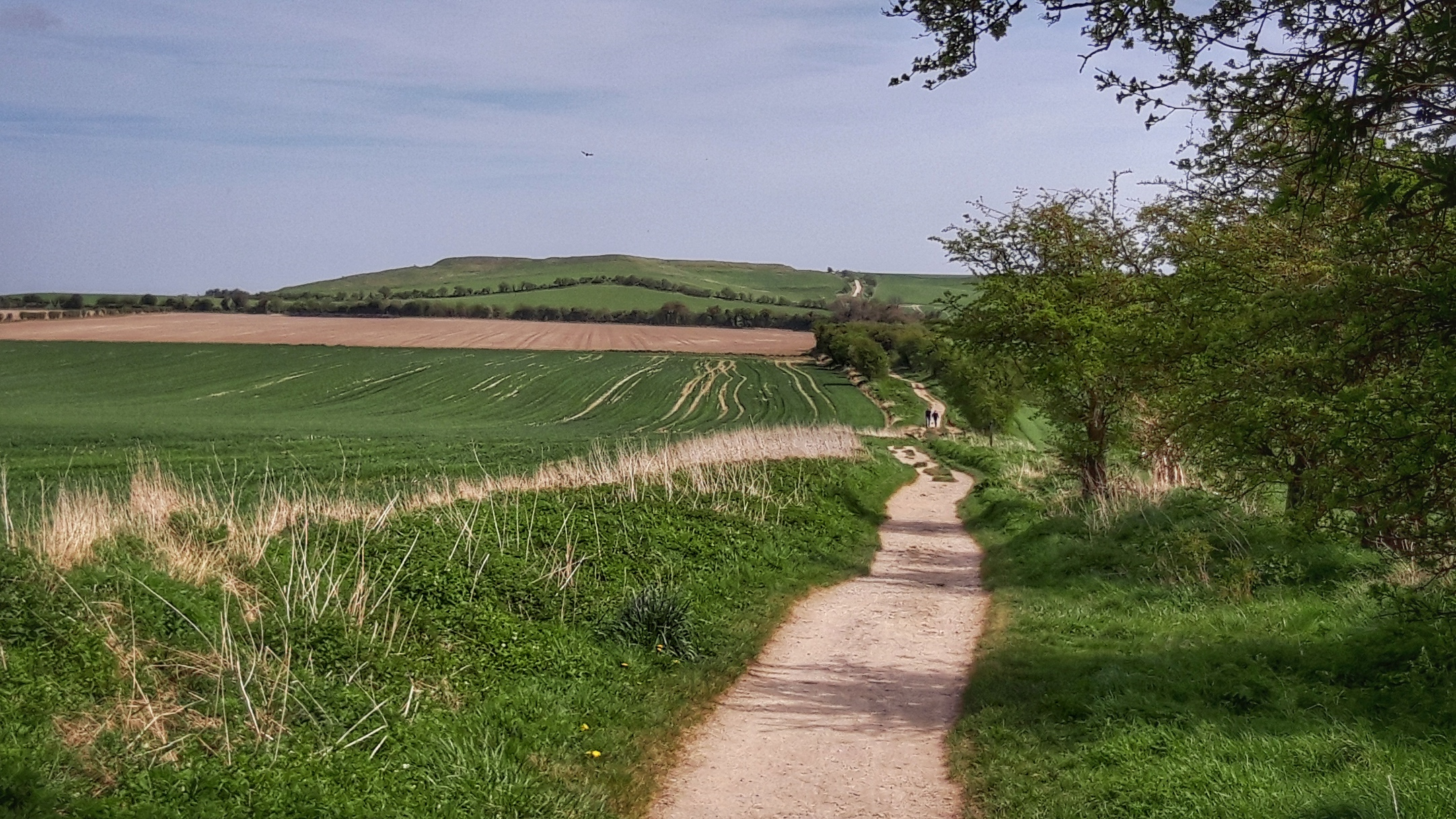
The Ridgeway approaching Whitehorse Hill from the west (Uffington Castle hillfort in distance on left)

For at least 5,000 years travellers have used the Ridgeway. The Ridgeway provided a reliable trading route to the Dorset coast and to the Wash in Norfolk. The high dry ground made travel easy and provided a measure of protection by giving traders a commanding view, warning against potential attacks. The Bronze Age saw the development of the Uffington White Horse and the stone circle at Avebury. During the Iron Age, inhabitants took advantage of the high ground by building hillforts along the Ridgeway to help defend the trading route. Following the collapse of Roman authority in Western Europe, invading Saxon and Viking armies used it. In medieval times and later, the Ridgeway found use by drovers, moving their livestock from the West Country and Wales to markets in the Home Counties and London. Before the inclosure acts of 1750, the Ridgeway existed as an informal series of tracks across the chalk downs, chosen by travellers based on path conditions. Once enclosures started, the current path developed through the building of earth banks and the planting of hedges.

== National Trail ==
The idea for a long-distance path along the line of the Wessex Downs and Chilterns goes back to the Hobhouse Committee of 1947. The present route was designated by the Government in 1972, and opened as a National Trail in 1973.

One of fifteen long-distance National Trails in England and Wales, the Ridgeway travels for 87 miles (140 km) northeast from Overton Hill within the Avebury World Heritage Site to Ivinghoe Beacon near Tring. At Marlborough it meets the Wessex Ridgeway, a footpath opened in 1994 which follows the southwest section of the ancient track into Dorset, as far as Lyme Regis. At Ivinghoe Beacon the Ridgeway meets the Icknield Way Path which continues northeast towards Suffolk. The Ridgeway meets the more recent (1997) Thames Path National Trail at the Goring Gap, where the trails use opposite banks of the River Thames between Goring-on-Thames and Mongewell; the Thames Path follows the western bank and the Ridgeway the eastern.

The total height climbed along the path is 3,881 feet (1,183 m). The official guide to the trail divides The Ridgeway into six sections. It is possible to join or leave the trail at other locations with public transport links, including Avebury, Swindon, Wantage, Wallingford, Princes Risborough and Tring.

Sections of The Ridgeway
Section	Start point	Finish point	Distance	Ascent	Descent
1	Overton Hill	Ogbourne St George	9.0 miles (14.5 km)	627 feet (191 m)	866 feet (264 m)
2	Ogbourne St George	Sparsholt Firs	16 miles (25 km)	1,381 feet (421 m)	1,155 feet (352 m)
3	Sparsholt Firs	Streatley	17 miles (28 km)	794 feet (242 m)	1,362 feet (415 m)
4	Streatley	Watlington	15 miles (24 km)	1,300 feet (400 m)	1,076 feet (328 m)
5	Watlington	Wendover	17 miles (27 km)	1,800 feet (550 m)	1,821 feet (555 m)
6	Wendover	Ivinghoe Beacon	11.6 miles (18.6 km)	1,339 feet (408 m)	1,033 feet (315 m)

The Ridgeway is one of four long-distance footpaths that combine to run from Lyme Regis to Hunstanton, collectively referred to as the Greater Ridgeway or Greater Icknield Way.

The Ridgeway passes near many Neolithic, Iron Age and Bronze Age sites including Avebury Stone Circle; Barbury Castle, Liddington Castle, Uffington Castle, Segsbury Castle, Pulpit Hill and Ivinghoe Beacon Hill, all Iron Age and Bronze Age hill forts; Wayland's Smithy, a Neolithic chieftain burial tomb; the Uffington White Horse, an ancient 400-foot (120 m) chalk horse carved into the hillside near Uffington Castle; and Grim's Ditch, a 5-mile (8 km) section of earthwork near Mongewell created by Iron Age peoples as a possible demarcation line. Other points of interest include the Blowing Stone and Victory Drive, the private drive of Chequers (the British Prime Minister's country retreat).

The Ridgeway's surface varies from chalk-rutted farm paths and green lanes (which have a propensity for becoming extremely muddy and pot-holed after rain) to small sections of metalled roads. Designated as a bridleway (shared with horses and bicycles) for much of its length, the Ridgeway also includes parts designated as byway, which permits the use of motorised vehicles. Local restrictions along many byway sections limit the use of motorised vehicles to the summer months. Under the Countryside and Rights of Way Act 2000, many public rights of way in England and Wales that authorities had not explicitly classified as bridleways or byways defaulted to the classification "restricted byway" which precludes the use of motor vehicles at all times, except authorised vehicles and where required for access. As a result, much of the Ridgeway remains prohibited to motor vehicle use by the general public year-round. However, the Ridgeway is the only means of access for many farms, especially in the more remote parts of the Downs.

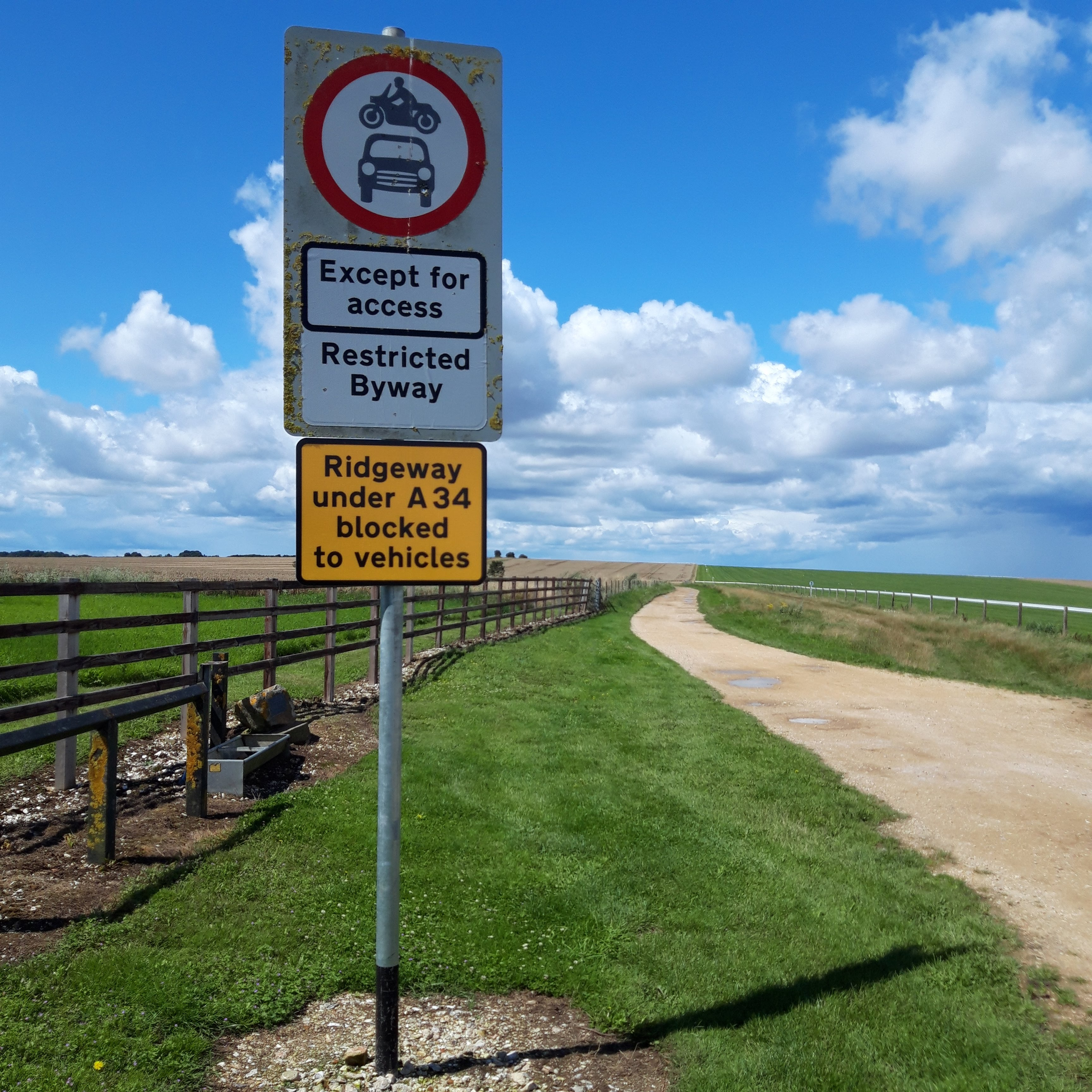
Sign alongside the Ridgeway indicating a restricted byway on Compton Downs

In 2024 the Ridgeway National Trail comprised 21 miles (34 km) of public footpath, 14 miles (23 km) of public bridleway, 20 miles (32 km) of byway (much of which has seasonal restrictions on motor vehicles), 22 miles (35 km) of restricted byway (all in Oxfordshire and Berkshire) and 10 miles (16 km) of public road. The 43 miles (69 km) of the Trail to the west of the River Thames has no sections of public footpath and is therefore open along its entire length to cyclists and those on horseback. The remaining 44 miles (71 km) of National Trail to the east of the River Thames contains the 21 miles (34 km) of public footpath in many noncontiguous parts, making it impractical for cyclists and those on horseback to follow this half of the Trail. The Ridgeway Partnership is currently in the process of creating a Ridgeway Riding Route.

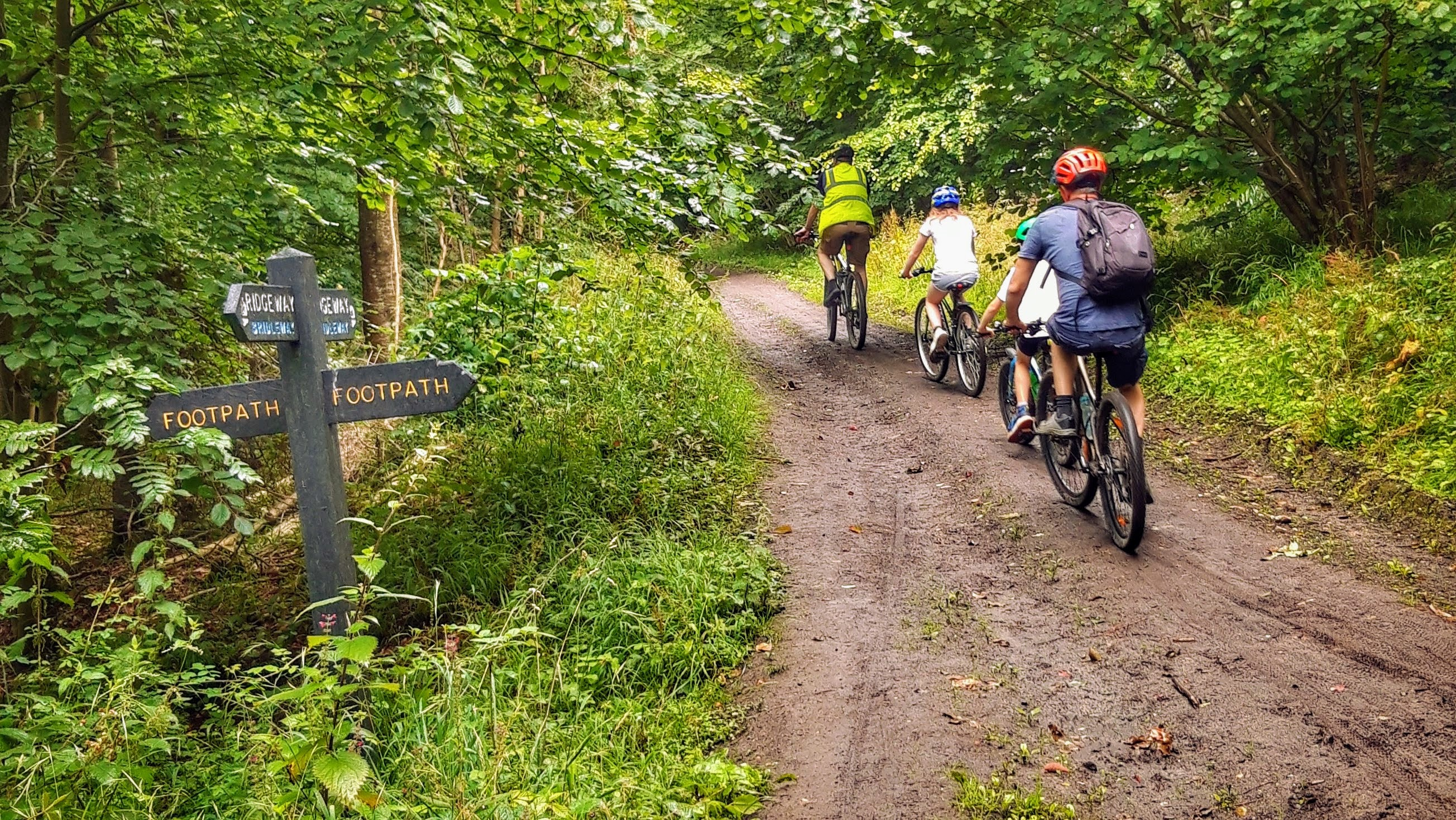
Cyclists on the Ridgeway National Trail in the Chilterns

The television programme Seven Natural Wonders featured it in 2005 as one of the wonders of the South.

=== Old Ridgeway ===
Also marked on the Ordnance Survey map, in antique font, is the Old Ridgeway. This is a section of the path that runs for 36 miles from Overton Hill to just outside Streatley and remains unspoilt, still open as a broad byway with few habitations along its length. The exception to this is four miles around Liddington Castle, which has been incorporated into the road system.

The Ridgeway National Trail mostly follows the Old Ridgeway for its length, this essentially being the first half of the route. The exception is the route between Barbury Castle and Liddington Castle, which diverts some two miles to Ogbourne St George in order to avoid the metalled roads.

== Places along the Ridgeway National Trail ==
Places that are near (or on) the Ridgeway National Trail include (from west to east):

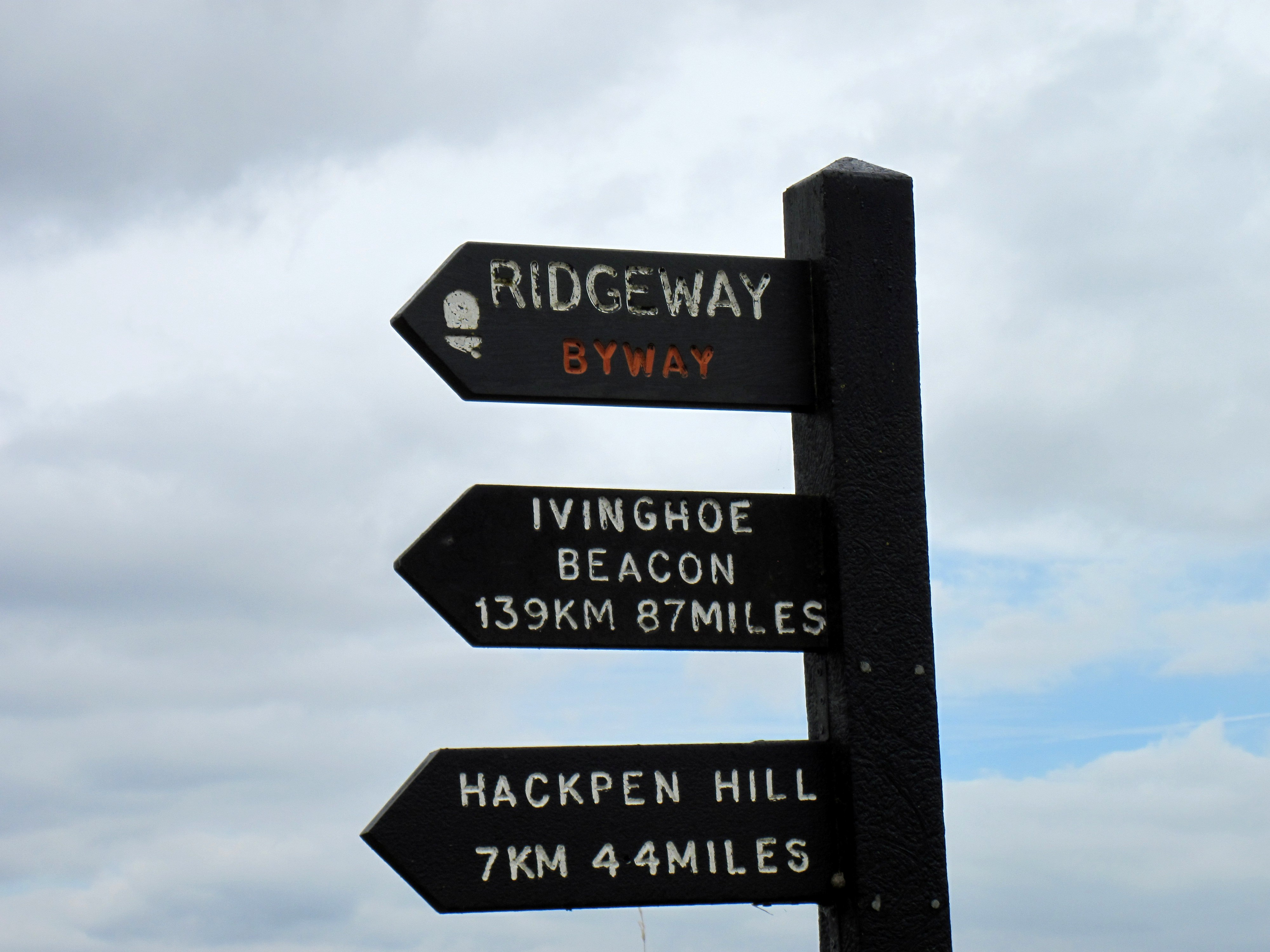
The distinctive black Ridgeway signposts are made from 'Plaswood', an environmentally friendly and maintenance-free plastic material made from recycled waste.

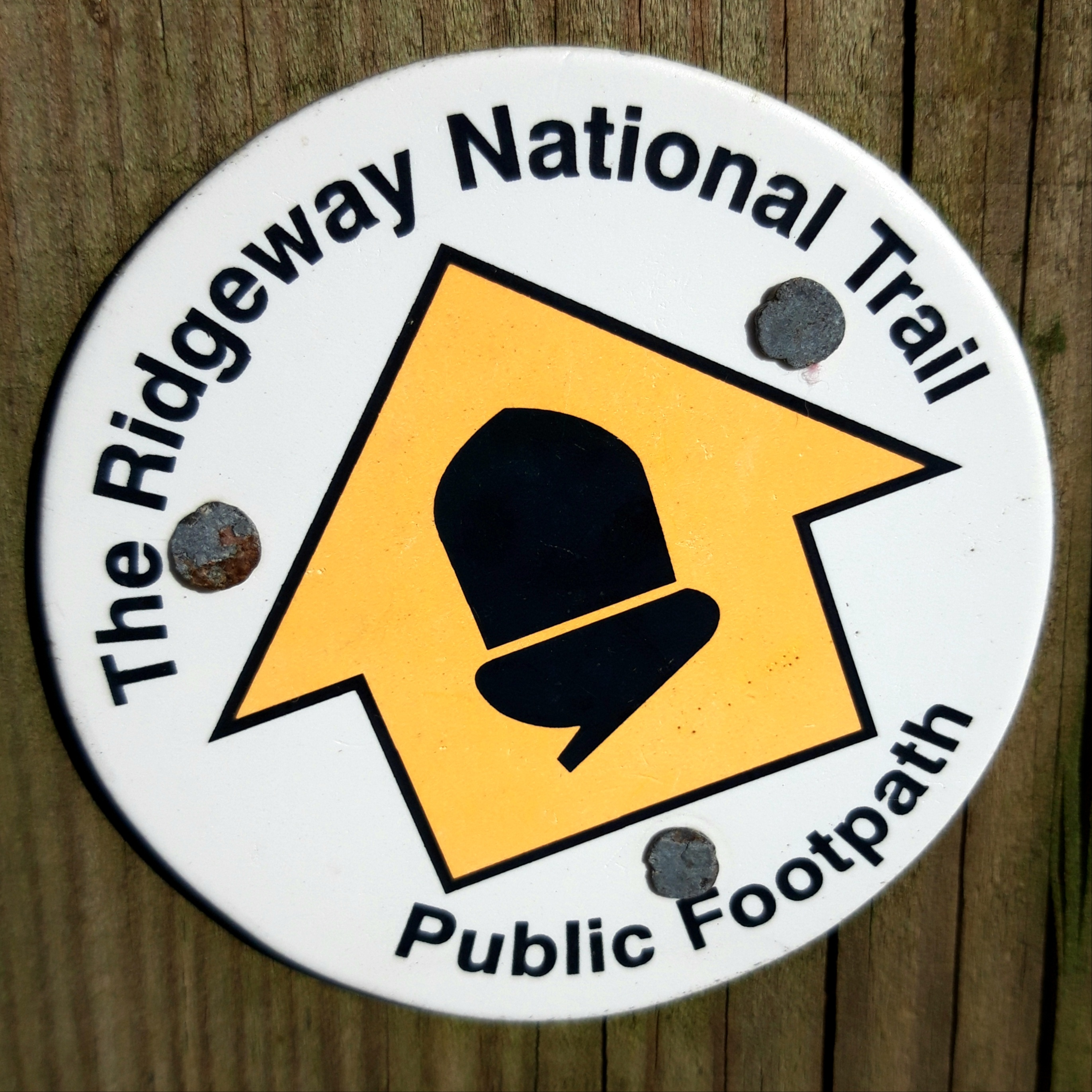
The acorn symbol is used on waymarkers along the Ridgeway National Trail, in common with the other National Trails in England and Wales.

- Avebury
- Overton Hill
- Fyfield Down
- Hackpen White Horse
- Barbury Castle
- Swindon
- Marlborough
- Liddington Castle
- Wanborough
- Charlbury Hill
- Wayland's Smithy
- Whitehorse Hill: Uffington Castle and Uffington White Horse
- Lambourn
- Segsbury Camp
- Wantage
- West Lockinge
- East Lockinge
- West Ginge
- West Hendred
- East Hendred
- Harwell
- Chilton
- West Ilsley
- East Ilsley
- Compton
- Didcot
- Blewbury
- Streatley
- Goring-on-Thames
- South Stoke
- North Stoke
- Mongewell
- Wallingford
- Watlington
- Chinnor
- Princes Risborough
- Cadsden
- Wendover
- Tring
- Wigginton
- Cholesbury Camp
- Ivinghoe Beacon

== Bibliography ==
- Ingrams, Richard (1988). The Ridgeway: Europe's Oldest Road. Phaidon Press Limited. ISBN 0-7148-2506-9.
- Crampton, Patrick (1965). The Prehistoric Ridge Way: A Journey. The Abbey Press, Abingdon-on-Thames.
- Thomas, Edward (1916). The Icknield Way. Constable & Company Ltd, London.
- Burton, Anthony (2016). The Ridgeway: National Trail Guide. Aurum Press Ltd. ISBN 978-1781315736.
- Hill, Nick (2021). The Ridgeway: Two-way guide. Trailblazer Publications. ISBN 978-1912716203.
- Davison, Steve (2016). Walking the Ridgeway National Trail: Avebury to Ivinghoe Beacon described in both directions. Cicerone Press. ISBN 978-1852848743.
- Anderson, J.R.L.; Godwin, Fay (1975). The Oldest Road: An Exploration of the Ridgeway. Garden City Press Ltd. ISBN 0704501686.
