= Liddington Castle =

Hillfort in Wiltshire, England

- Liddington Camp
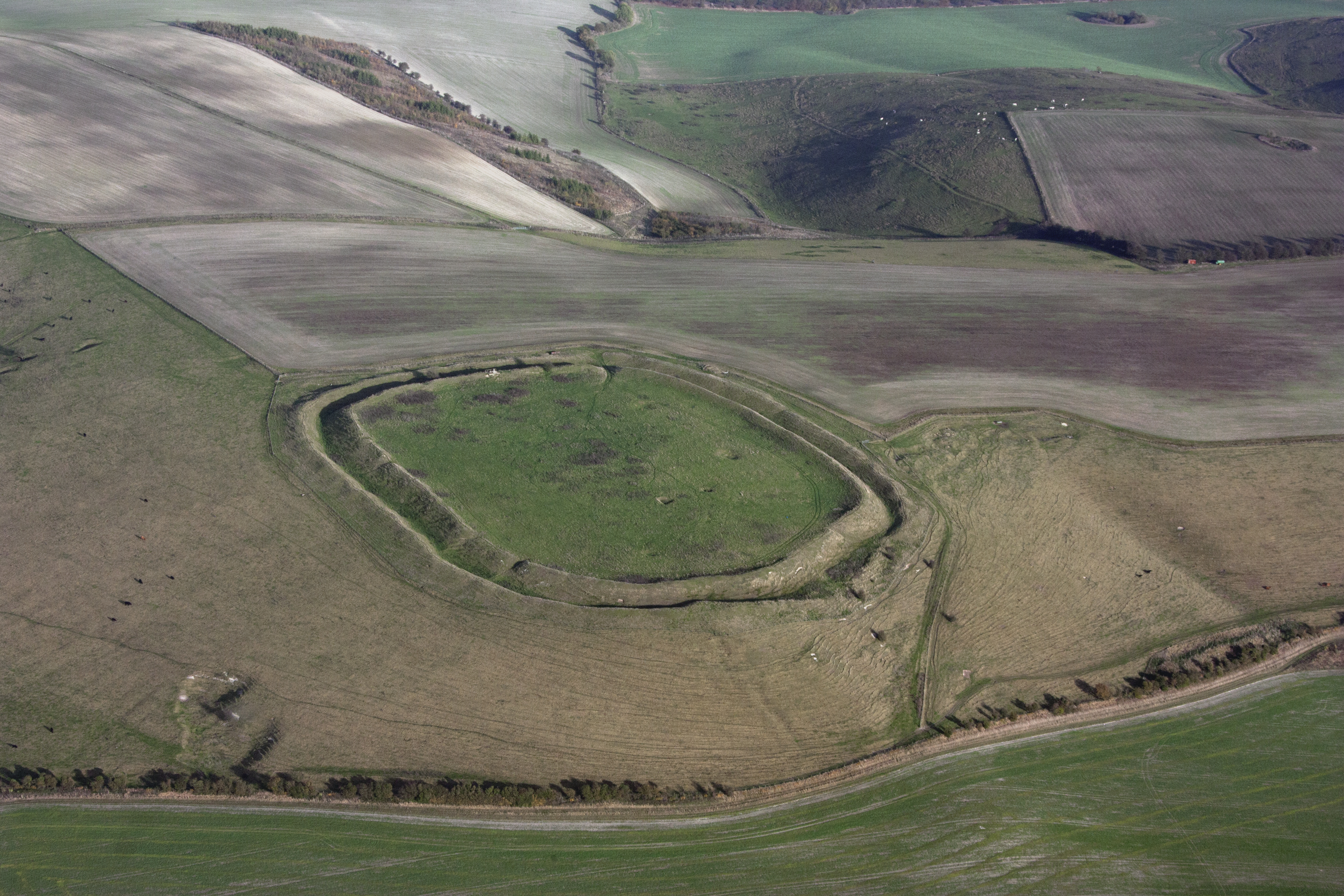
- Aerial photograph of Liddington Castle

- Liddington Castle shown within Wiltshire
- 51.516°N 1.700°W
- Periods: Late Bronze Age and Iron Age
- Part of: The Ridgeway
- OS grid reference: SU209797

History
- Built: 7th century BC

Site notes
- Elevation: 277 m (909 ft)
- Area: 3 hectares (7.4 acres)
- Excavation dates: 1976
- Public access: yes

Designations
- Designation: Scheduled Monument

Scheduled monument
- Official name: Liddington Castle
- Designated: 10 March 1925
- Reference no.: 1016312

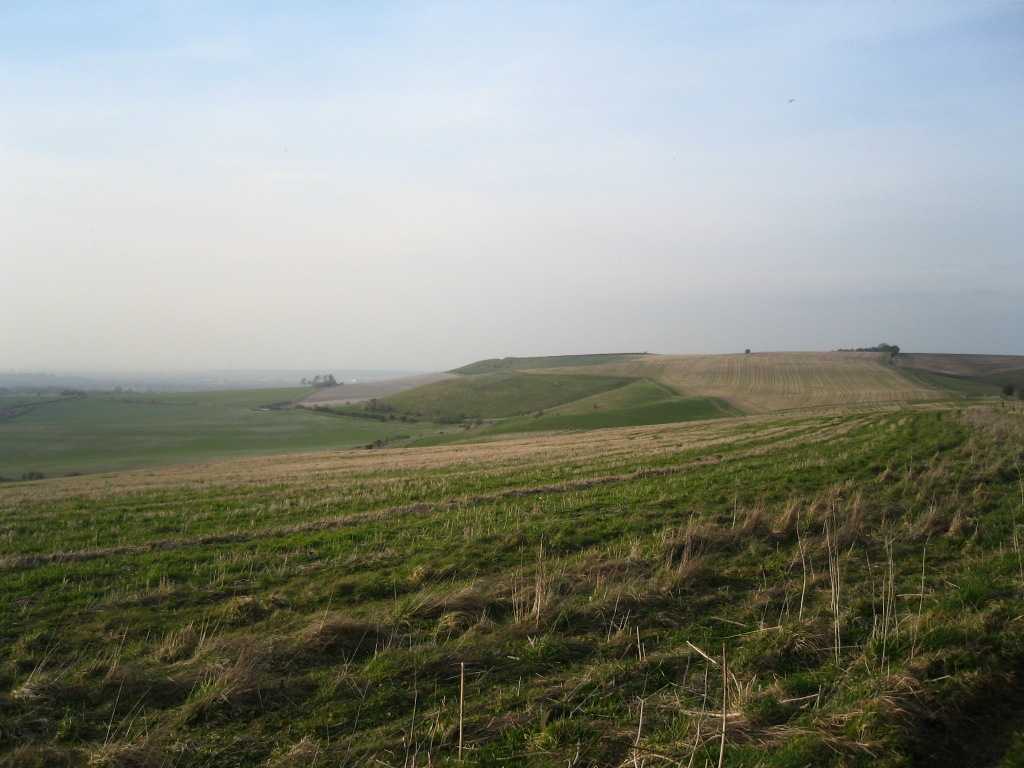
Liddington Castle

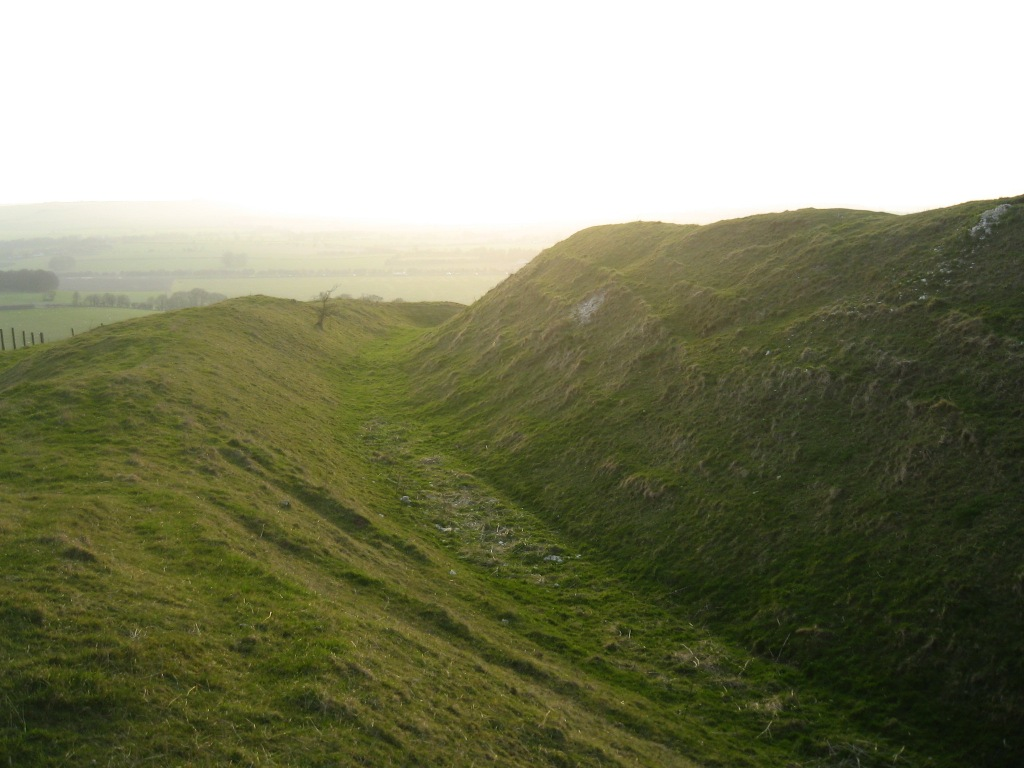
Earthworks at Liddington Castle

Liddington Castle, locally called Liddington Camp, is a late Bronze Age and early Iron Age univallate hillfort in Liddington parish in the English county of Wiltshire, and a scheduled monument.

== Description ==
The site is on a commanding high point close to the Ridgeway and covers an area of 3 hectares (7.4 acres). Liddington Castle was one of the earliest hillforts in Britain, with first occupation dating to the 7th century BC. The earthworks consist of a relatively simple oval bank of timber and earth fronted by a ditch, with opposing causewayed entrances on the east and west sides. The western entrance was later blocked off and the eastern one may have been lined with sarsen stones. A palisade of wooden posts may have lined the top of the bank. During a later phase the bank and ditch were improved and a rampart of dumped chalk, excavated from the enlarged ditch, increased the height of the bank.

== Archaeology ==
The site was disturbed by flint mining between 1896 and 1900. The archaeologist A. D. Passmore collected "everything of human manufacture which was found" during this period, and the artefacts were deposited in the Ashmolean Museum. Passmore wrote about these findings in the Wiltshire Archaeological and Natural History Magazine in 1914 (issue 38).

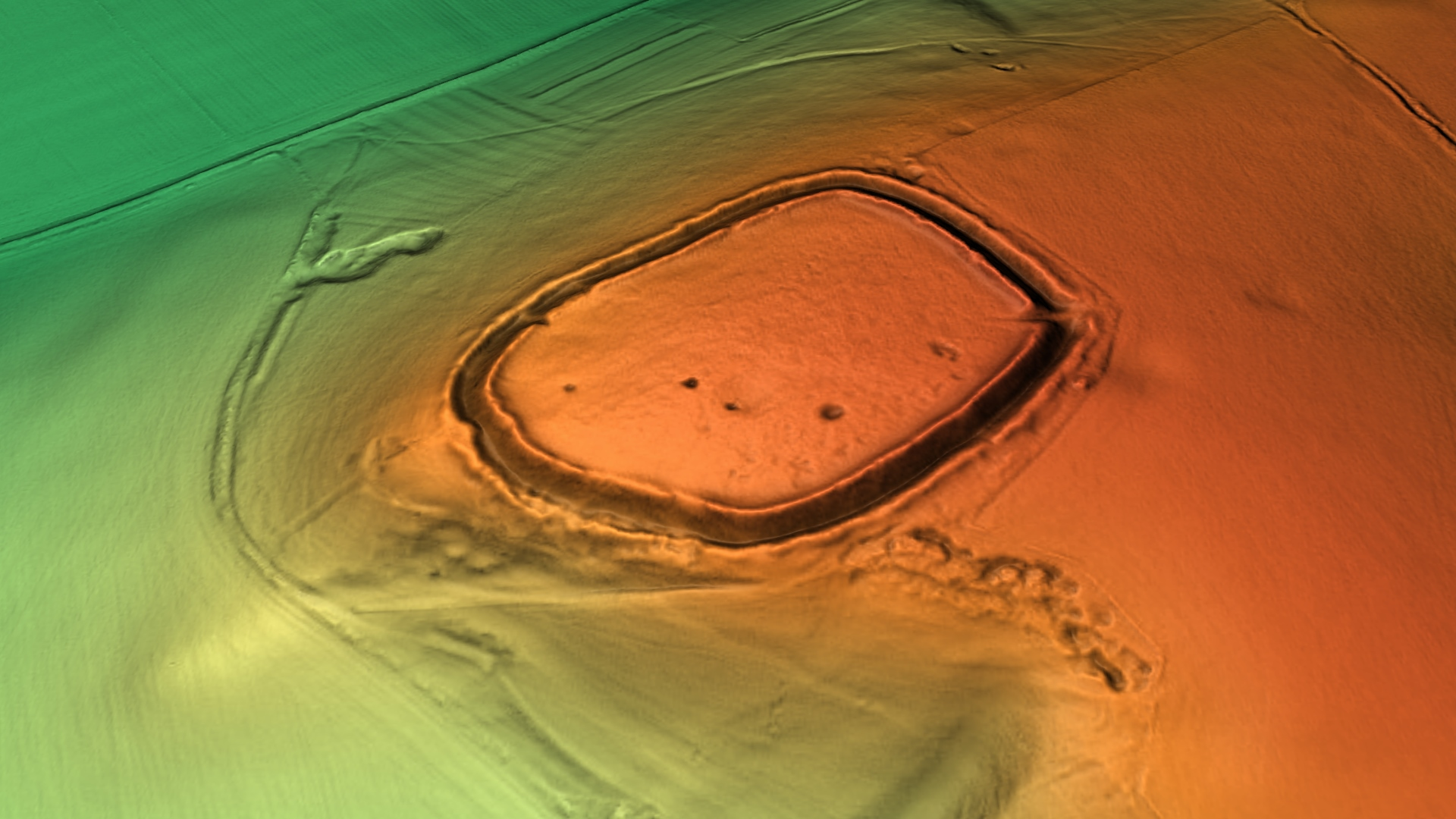
3D view of the digital terrain model

The hillfort was partially excavated in 1976 (sponsored by Lamar University and University of Birmingham). The excavation revealed a large pit 1.5 metres (4 ft 11 in) in diameter and at least 2.4 metres (7 ft 10 in) deep. The bottom of the feature was not reached and it was interpreted by the archaeologists who dug it as a ritual shaft. Similar shafts have been recorded at Wapley Hill in Herefordshire and Cadbury Castle in Devon. The excavation also suggested the rampart was constructed in four phases, the latest being in during the Saxon period. Finds of pottery suggest Liddington Castle was abandoned during the fifth century BC, with perhaps some later re-occupation during the Roman period. The excavation uncovered four fragments of human bone.

Liddington Castle is sometimes suggested as a possible site of Mount Badon, and thus the location of the late fifth-century AD Battle of Mount Badon mentioned in Gildas's De Excidio et Conquestu Britanniae, Nennius's Historia Brittonum and Annales Cambriae. There is, however, no archaeological evidence to indicate activity during this later period.

== Liddington Hill ==
The hillfort is 275 metres (902 ft) above sea level; there is an Ordnance Survey triangulation pillar. The natural summit of the hill is a short distance to the south-east and at 276.5 m (907 ft) above sea level, with a prominence of 114m, and is classified as a Hump (hill with a hundred metre or greater prominence). It is the highest point in the Borough of Swindon.

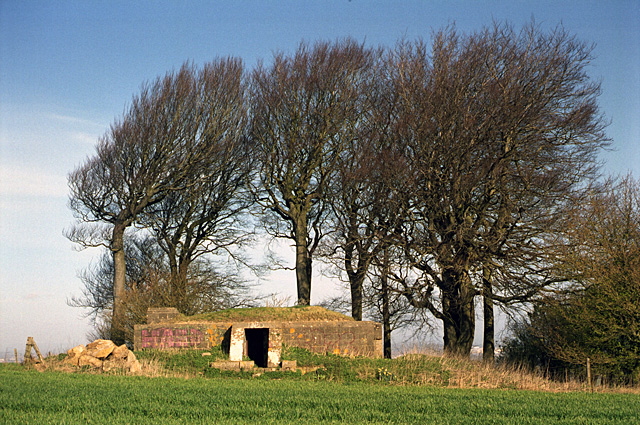
World War II control bunker on Liddington Hill in 2012

During the Second World War, the hilltop surrounding Liddington Castle was used as a Starfish site (a bombing decoy designed to appear as a burning town or city). (Note: The site is SF41(a) and C71(a).) Evidence of this use remains in the form of the surviving command bunker, located 1 kilometre (0.62 mi) north-east of the fort, and a metal trough used to simulate explosions and fire.

Liddington Castle was a favourite haunt of local writer of natural history and rural life, Richard Jefferies, who spent much of his spare time walking through the wide chalk expanses of the Marlborough Downs. It was on this summit that he relates in The Story of My Heart that his unusual sensitivity to nature began to induce in him a powerful inner awakening – a desire for a larger existence or reality.

The hill is frequently used by the Thames Valley Hang Gliding and Paragliding Club.

== See also ==
- List of hillforts in England
