= Goring and Streatley =

Goring and Streatley are twin villages in the English counties of Oxfordshire and Berkshire respectively, separated by the River Thames and joined by a bridge. The villages are administratively separate entitles but are sometimes treated as one village for the purpose of naming shared buildings.

For the villages, see:

- Goring-on-Thames
- Streatley

For jointly named entities, see:

- Goring and Streatley Bridge
- Goring and Streatley Golf Club
- Goring and Streatley railway station
