= Gatehampton Railway Bridge =

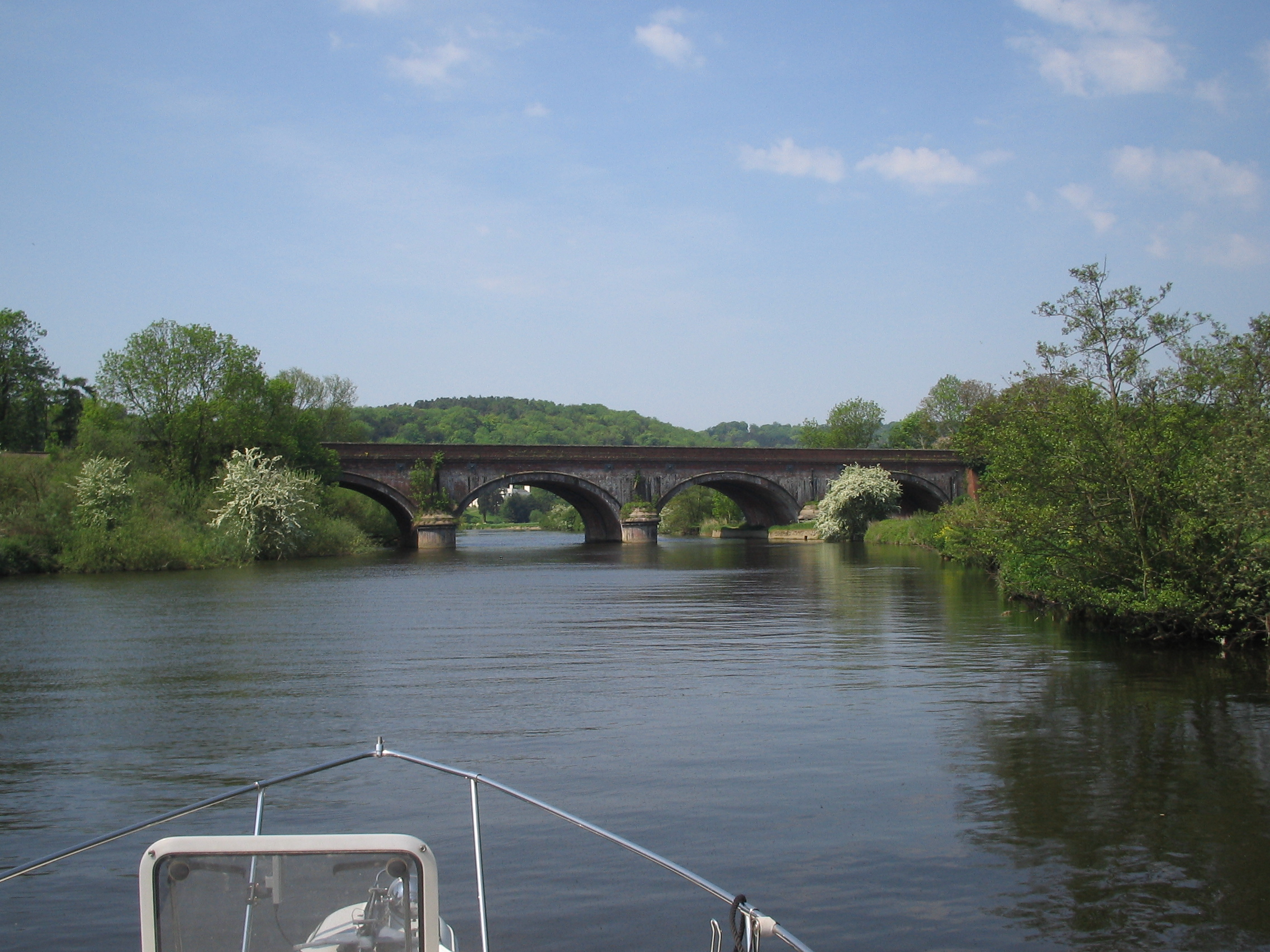
- Gatehampton Railway Bridge
- Coordinates: 51°30′42″N 1°07′40.5″W
- Carries: Great Western Main Line
- Crosses: River Thames
- Locale: Lower Basildon, Berkshire

Characteristics
- Design: Arch
- Material: Brick
- Height: 22 feet 10 inches (6.96 m)
- Piers in water: 2

History
- Designer: Isambard Kingdom Brunel
- Opened: 1840

Location
- Interactive map of Gatehampton Railway Bridge

Gatehampton Railway Bridge, otherwise referred to as Gatehampton Viaduct, is a railway bridge carrying the Great Western Main Line over the River Thames in Lower Basildon, Berkshire, England. It takes the line between the stations at Goring and Streatley and Pangbourne, and crosses the Thames on the reach between Whitchurch Lock and Goring Lock.

The western viaduct is the older of the two, having been engineered by Isambard Kingdom Brunel and was constructed at the same time as Maidenhead Railway Bridge and Moulsford Railway Bridge. It was built between 1838 and 1840, opening later that same year. A second phase of work, conducted between 1890 and 1893, involved the construction of the east relief bridge along with the refurbishment of the west bridge. They have become prominent manmade features of the local riverside landscape; on 19 June 1984, they became formally protected as a Grade II listed structure.

== History ==
The Gatehampton Railway Bridge is actually two individual viaducts running parallel to one another, sharing cutwaters. The west or fast viaduct was the first to be constructed, being a part of the Great Western Railway's (GWR) original route between London and Bristol. The line was authorised during 1835 by an Act of Parliament, while construction commenced during the following year. The bridge was designed by the noted civil engineer Isambard Kingdom Brunel, who served as the lead engineer of the line for the GWR, to carry the main line over the River Thames. Brunel's chosen route, designed to be as direct and level as possible, required the line to cross the River Thames twice in the narrow Goring Gap, west of Reading, necessitating the construction of two bridges at Gatehampton and Moulsford.

At Gatehampton, Brunel opted to build a masonry bridge. This structure largely conformed with the typical architectural idioms of the era while featuring aesthetically pleasing detailing. His decision to adopt track broad gauge for the line necessitated the bridge's width of 30 feet to accommodate a pair of lines. Construction of the viaduct took place between 1838 and 1840. As a means of reducing the mass of the bridge and its foundations, which reduced material, time and cost alike, Brunel using a system of internal longitudinal walls and voids to lighten the superstructure above the arches, reduced the forces acting through the structure. Opened to traffic shortly thereafter, the line quickly became a busy trunk route.

By the 1870s, it was clear that more capacity along the line was needed to meet demand, especially towards the London end of the route. The GWR's management decided to widen the line from two to four tracks wherever reasonable to do so. This work was carried out in two stages, between London and Taplow in 1875–1884, and between Taplow and Didcot in 1890–1893; around this same time period, the original broad gauge tracks were progressively phased out, the line being converted to standard gauge instead. To carry the additional two tracks, between 1890 and 1893, the east or relief viaduct was constructed. This extension work was designed with great respect for the existing structure, deliberately featuring little variation from Brunel's design; the west viaduct was also partly refaced around this period.

On 19 June 1984, the Historic Buildings and Monuments Commission for England recognised Gatehampton Bridge as a historic feature, designated it as a Grade II listed structure. The reasoning for this protection included its age, dating back to the pioneering phase of the GWR, Brunel's involvement, and its engineering and material interest, observing the bridge's elliptical-arched design to be elegant and the brickwork to be of a high standard, with relatively little alteration from its original design since the 1890s.

During the 2010s, the railway lines crossing the bridge were electrified, requiring the installation of 25 kV 50 Hz AC OHLE across the structure. Members of the public voiced concerns over the aesthetic impact of such modifications to the structure; for its part, Network Rail commissioned studies into minimising the visual impact of the electrification effort.

== Design ==
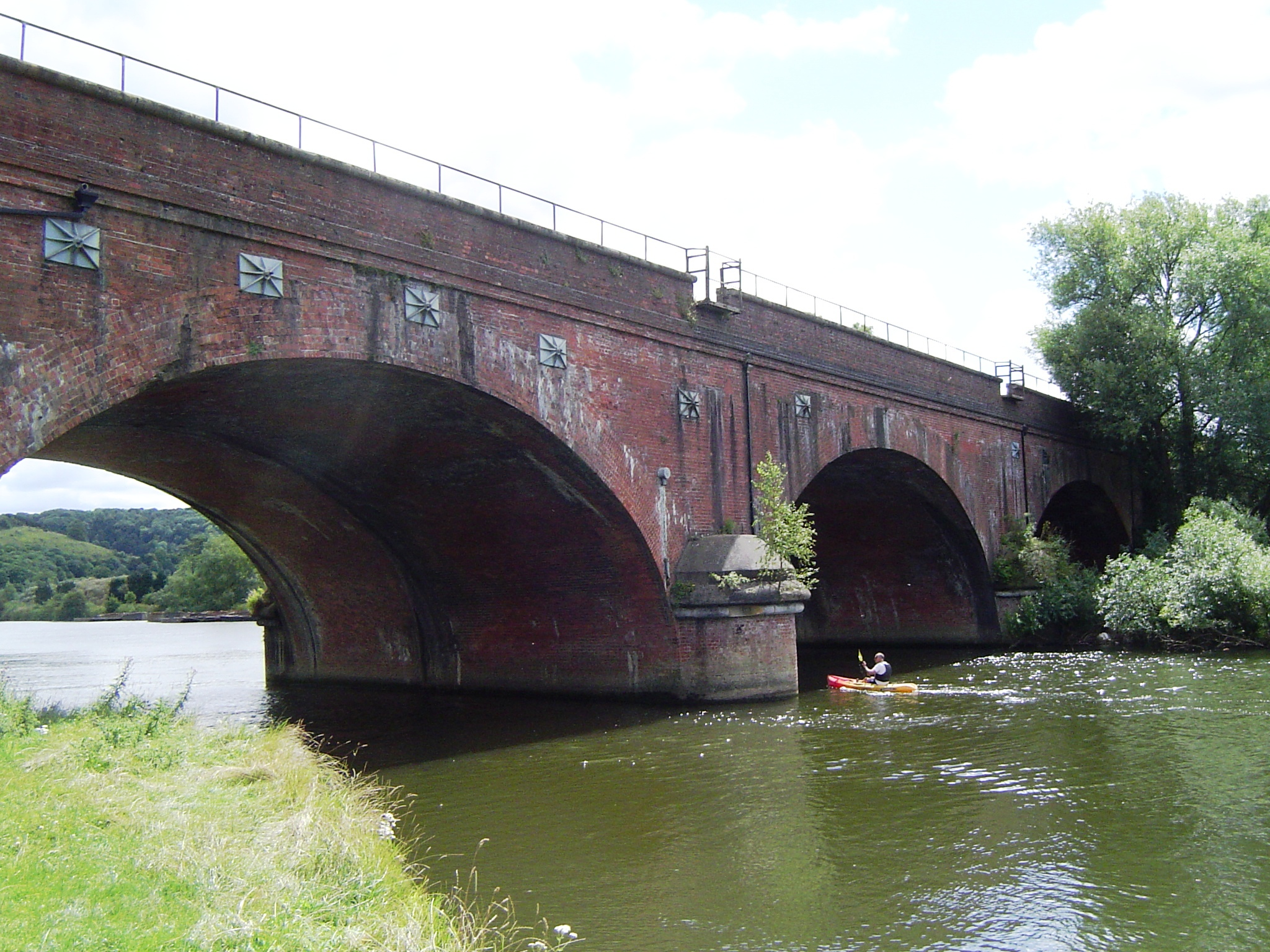
Gatehampton Railway Bridge from the upstream bank

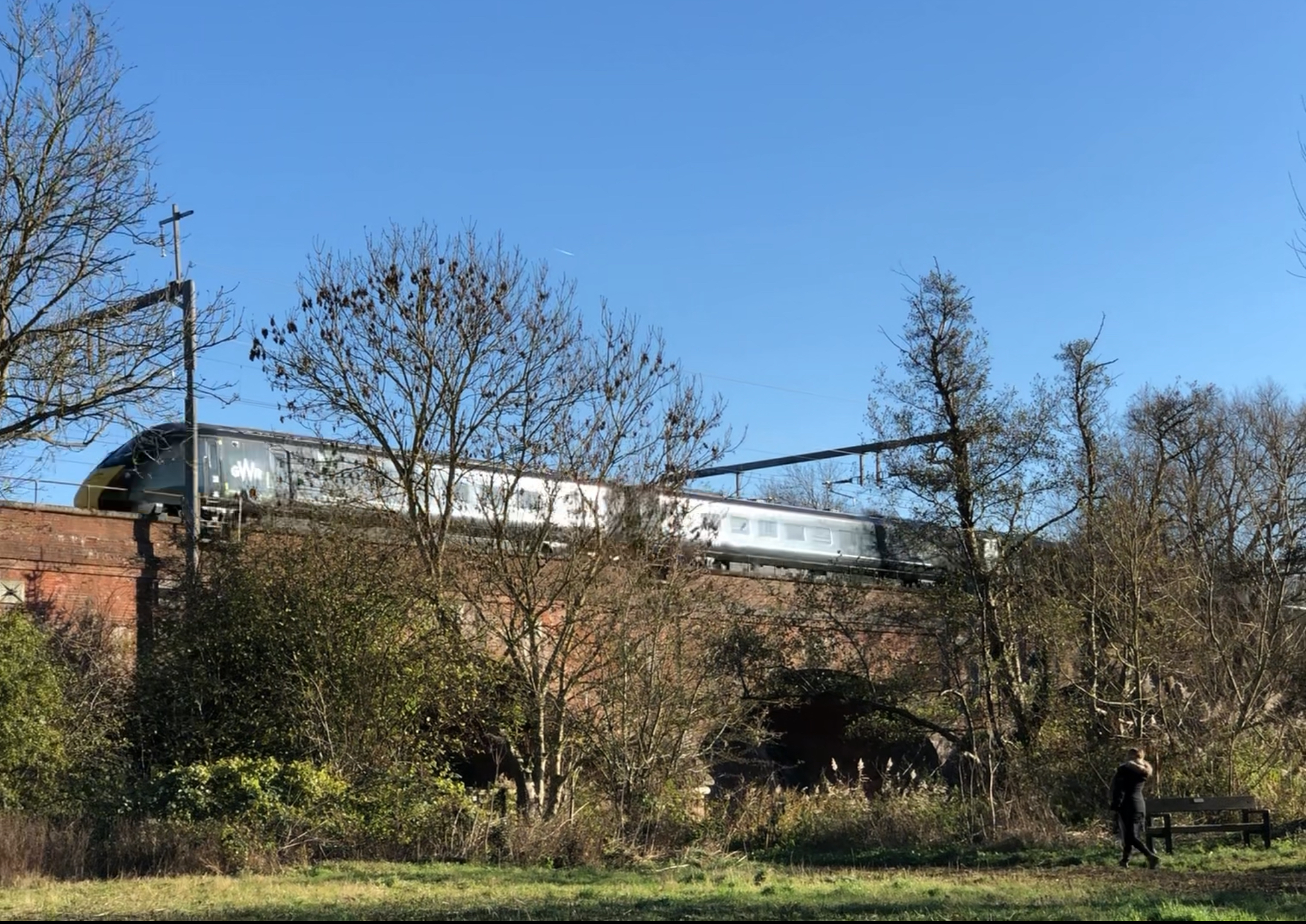
A GWR class 800 traverses the Viaduct on a cold winter morning

Each of the two bridges consists of four low semi-elliptical arches, having a combined length of 120 metres and a width of 18 metres. The arches rise from water level from round cutwaters moulded in ashlar and featuring a square span of 19 metres. In relation to the river below, the bridge is noticeably skewed, using step-outs on each bank with raked and slightly splayed abutments. The bridge is primarily composed of red brick, laid in English bond with Bramley Fall gritstone dressings. It features a plain, shallow stepped string-course along with several tie plates.

Several changes of the structure have been performed over time. The arch voussoirs, which were originally composed of stone, have been replaced with brick counterparts. Repairs to the structure have largely used red engineering bricks, somewhat similar to the original brickwork. The later-built eastern bridge is largely similar to the western structure; one difference is the presence of stone roll moulding around the arch rings, there are also no refuges or railings installed. In comparison, the parapets of the western bridge have stone coping with rounded edges, broken by open steel refuges over every pier, along with steel railings along the top of the parapet.

== See also ==
- Crossings of the River Thames

| Next crossing upstream | River Thames | Next crossing downstream |
| Goring and Streatley Bridge | Gatehampton Railway Bridge; Grid reference SU6062179546 | Whitchurch Bridge |
