= Whitchurch Lock =

Lock and weir on the River Thames in Oxfordshire, England

Coordinates: 51.48661°N 1.08830°W

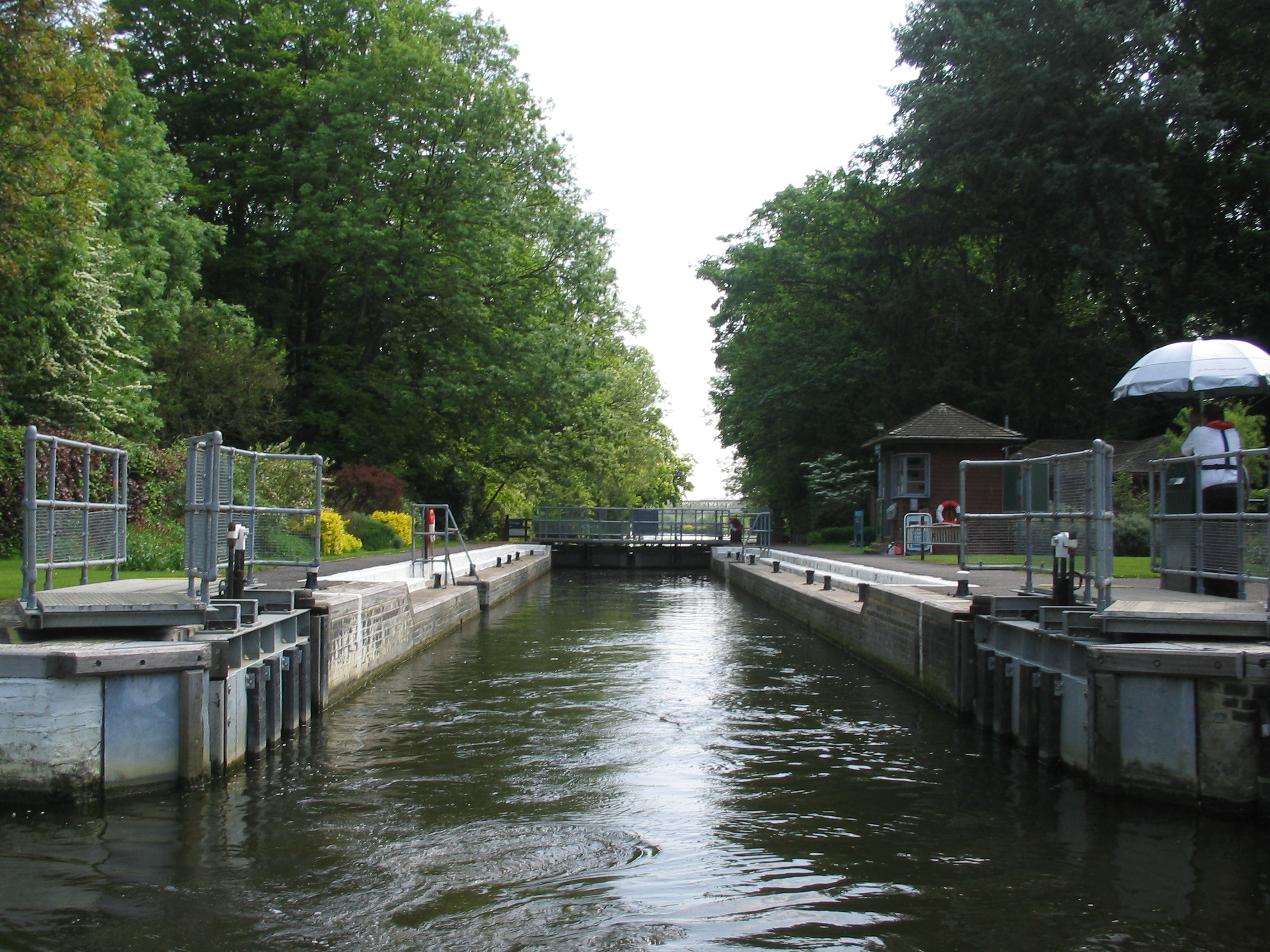
- Whitchurch Lock with head gates open
- Waterway: River Thames
- County: Oxfordshire
- Maintained by: Environment Agency
- Operation: Hydraulic
- First built: 1787
- Latest built: 1876
- Length: 41.22 m (135 ft 3 in)
- Width: 5.48 m (18 ft 0 in)
- Fall: 1.01 m (3 ft 4 in)
- Above sea level: 130'
- Distance to Teddington Lock: 61 miles

Whitchurch Lock is a lock and weir on the River Thames in England. It is a pound lock, built by the Thames Navigation Commissioners in 1787. It is on an island near the Oxfordshire village of Whitchurch-on-Thames and is accessible only by boat.

The weir crosses the river to the Berkshire village of Pangbourne.

== History ==
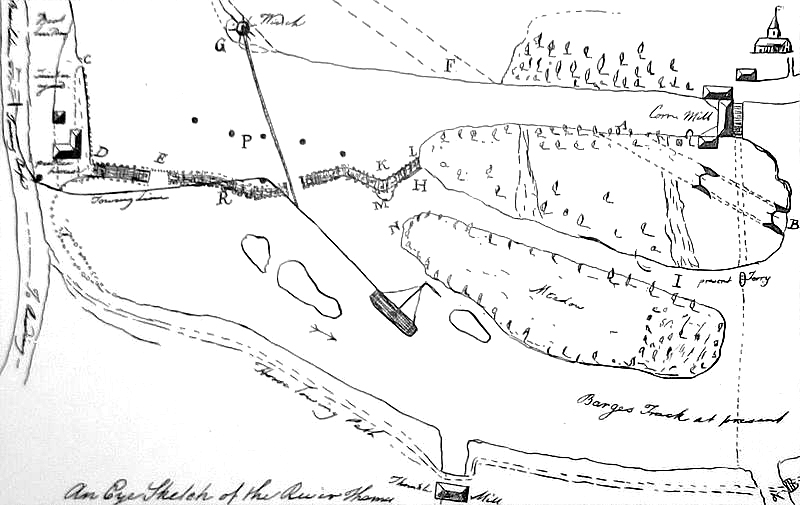
Sketch of the flash lock before the building of the pound lock

There was a flash lock recorded at Whitchurch in the 16th century. The sketch map shows the main dam, which was solid and rose to a height above normal high water level. Near the southern bank, there was a sluice (marked "E" on the sketch), which was 30 feet (9.1 m) wide, and was fitted with flood gates and overfall boards, to accommodate a drop of 3 to 4 feet (0.91 to 1.22 m) in the river level. The flash lock was in the centre, with a winch on the north bank to haul the barges through against the current. It was 23 feet (7.0 m) wide, which was the standard size for all flash locks below Abingdon. Near to the island was a "tumbling bay", an overfall weir with its crest just below normal low water level. It was about 35 feet (11 m) wide and is marked "H" on the sketch. In common with most of the weirs on the Thames, the width of the tumbling bay was gradually increased, until it formed most of the weir, apart from the sluice.

The pound lock, built of oak, was installed at the island in the summer of 1787. Two alternative sites were originally considered. One would have expanded the mill stream on the Whitchurch side, and another would have involved a cut across land occupied by the Swan public house at Pangbourne. A lock house was built on the island in the 1830s. In the later 19th century local people used to cross over the weir to avoid paying tolls on the bridge. The lock was rebuilt in 1876 and access across the weir was closed. The right of way from Whitchurch to the lock was closed in 1888.

== Access to the lock ==
Whitchurch Lock is the only lock on the River Thames which has no public access other than by boat.

== Reach above the lock ==
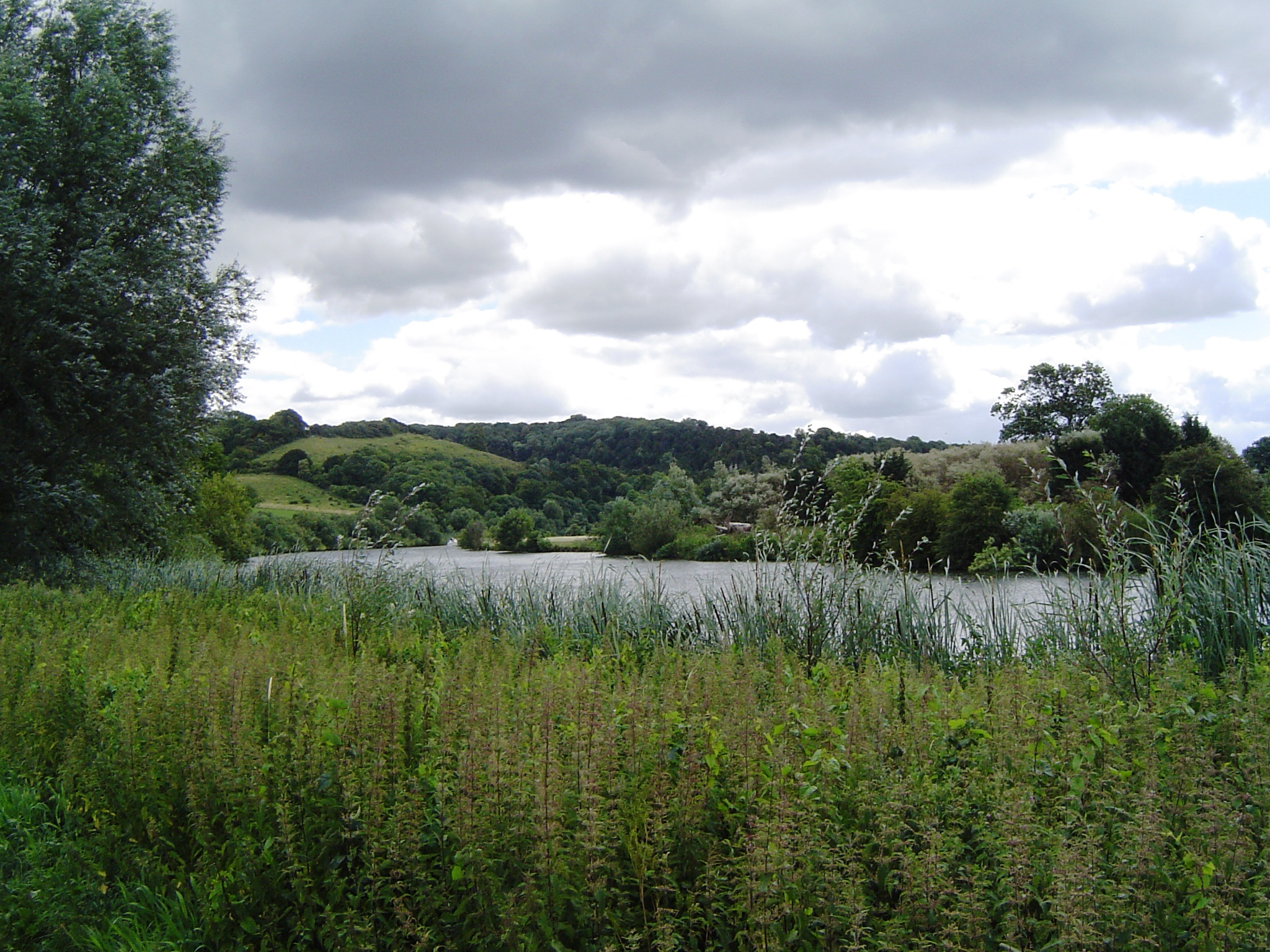
View from near Gatehampton downstream towards Harts Lock Woods

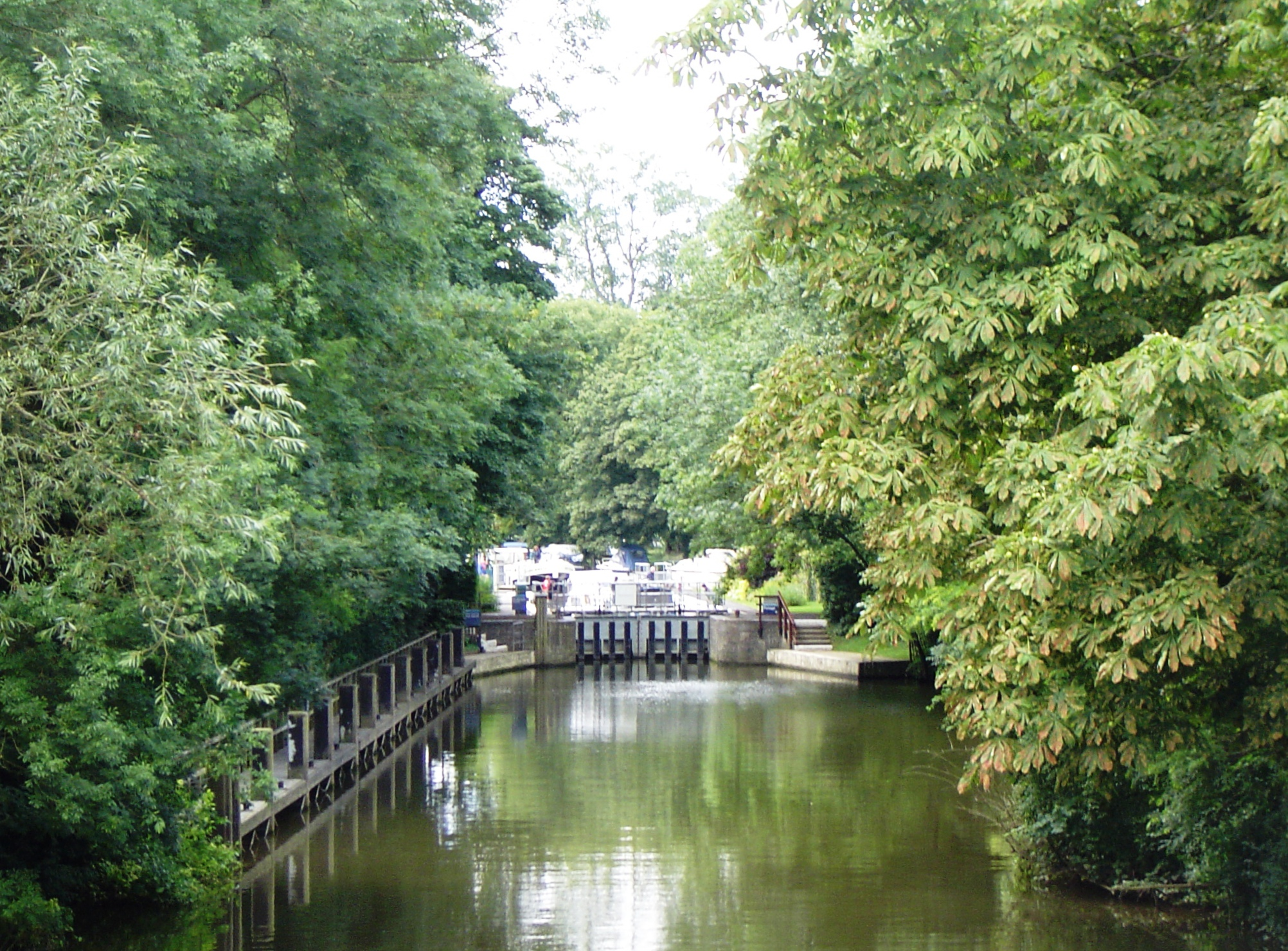
Whitchurch Lock from downstream

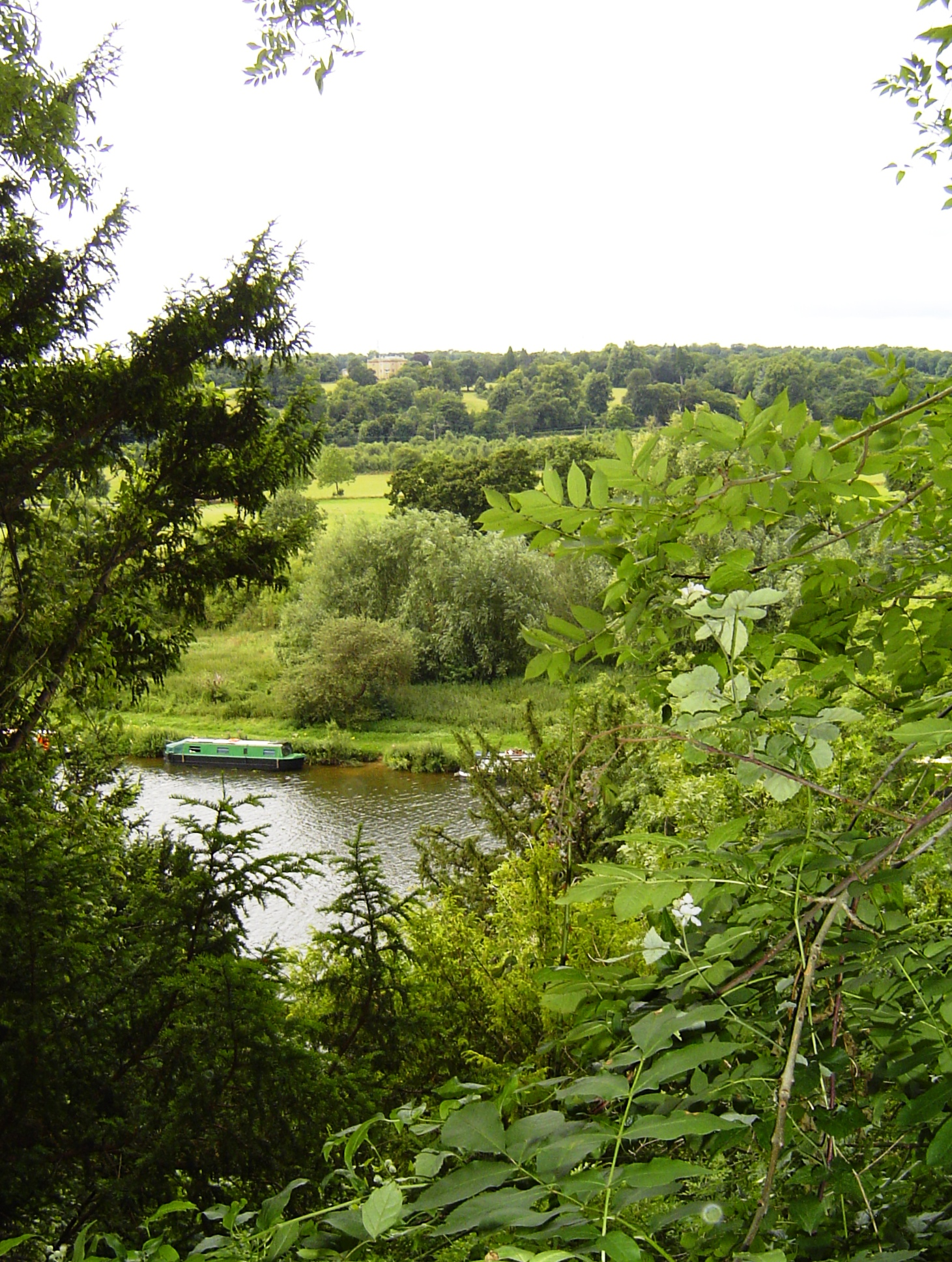
Basildon Park across the river from Harts Lock Woods

The reach passes along the Chiltern Hills, culminating in Goring Gap. Halfway along the reach is the Gatehampton Railway Bridge.

The hills on the Oxfordshire side are populated by houses at Whitchurch and are then covered by the Hartslock beech woods. This name derives from a lock among the islands below the hills. This had become disused by the time the pound locks were built, but the obstructions remaining from it were not removed until 1910. The river turns west away from the hills leaving flat meadows up to Goring.

On the Berkshire side the river passes the river side at Pangbourne where there are seven distinctive Edwardian-style houses overlooking the river. These were built by D. H. Evans the shop owner and were nicknamed the "Seven Deadly Sins" as it was alleged that he kept a mistress in each of them. Beyond this point is Beale Park and set back from the river is Basildon Park. The river turns north again at the Goring Gap where the hills on the Streatley side overshadow the river. Just before the Goring Lock is Goring and Streatley Bridge.

Pangbourne College is based on this stretch of the river and the Pangbourne Junior Sculls take place on the reach in November.

The Thames Path, having crossed Whitchurch Bridge, continues away from the river through the streets of Whitchurch and then through the woods. This is a section with steep inclines and long flights of steps. Once back to the river side at Hartslock, it continues on the Oxfordshire bank to Goring.

== See also ==
- Locks on the River Thames
- Rowing on the River Thames

Next lock upstream	River Thames	Next lock downstream
Goring Lock; 6.55 km (4.07 mi)	Whitchurch Lock; Grid reference SU634768	Mapledurham Lock; 3.67 km (2.28 mi)

== Bibliography ==
- Skempton, Alec (1996). Civil Engineers and Engineering in Britain, 1600-1830. Variorum. ISBN 978-0-86078-578-1.
