= Moulsford Railway Bridge =

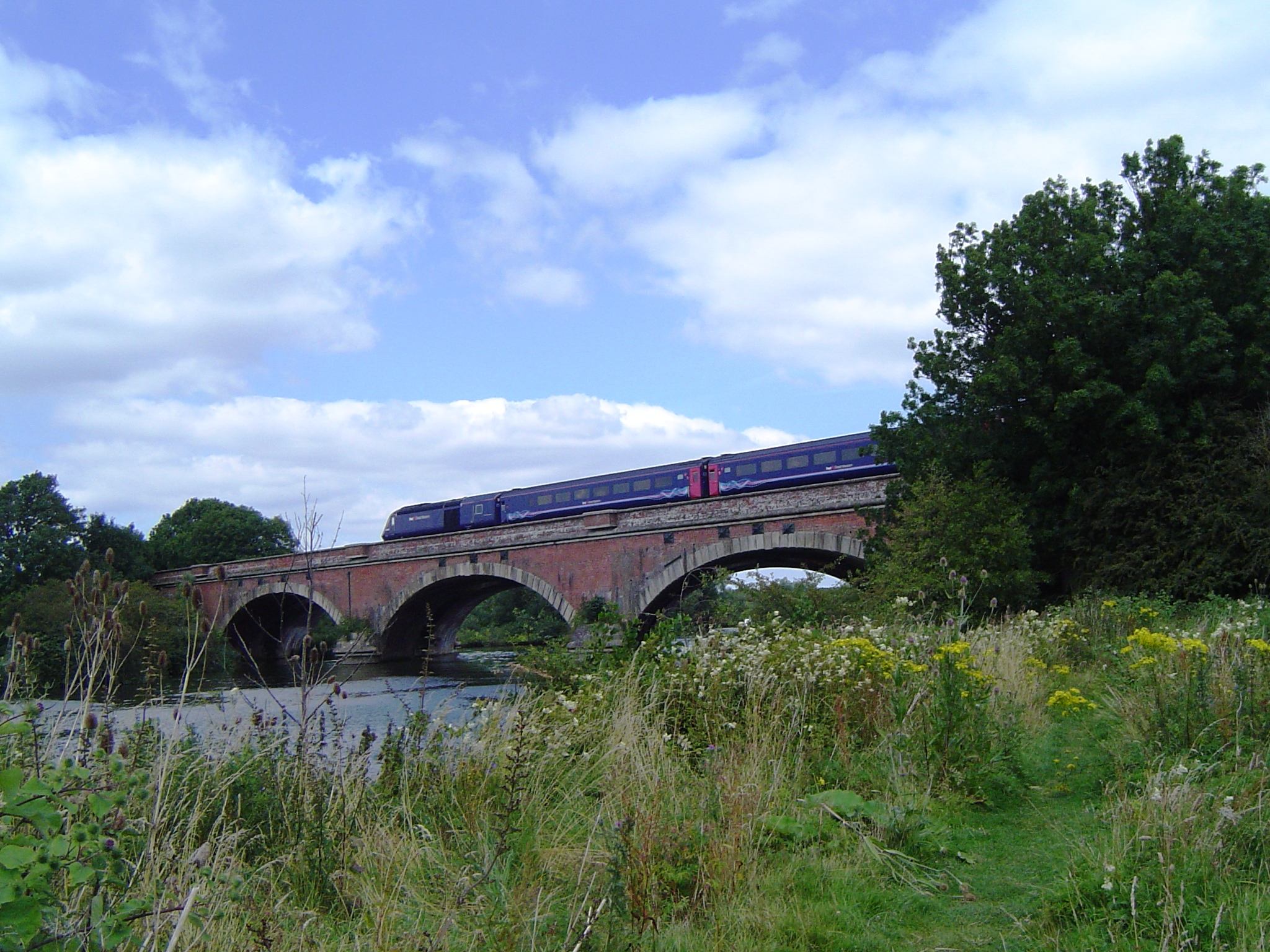
- Moulsford Railway Bridge (original) from downstream
- Coordinates: 51°33′29″N 1°08′33″W
- Carries: Great Western Main Line
- Crosses: River Thames
- Locale: Moulsford
- Maintained by: Network Rail
- Heritage status: Grade II* listed

Characteristics
- Design: Skew arch
- Material: Brick
- Height: 21 feet 8 inches (6.60 m)
- No. of spans: 4
- Piers in water: 3

Rail characteristics
- No. of tracks: 4
- Track gauge: 1,435 mm (4 ft 8 1/2 in)
- Electrified: 25 kV 50 Hz AC OHLE

History
- Designer: Isambard Kingdom Brunel
- Opened: 1839 and 1892

Location
- Interactive map of Moulsford Railway Bridge

Moulsford Railway Bridge, also known locally as "Four Arches" bridge, is a pair of parallel bridges located a little to the north of Moulsford and South Stoke in Oxfordshire, UK. It carries the Great Western Main Line from Paddington, London to Wales and the West across the River Thames. The bridge lies between the stations at Goring & Streatley and Cholsey, and crosses the Thames at an oblique angle on the reach between Cleeve Lock and Benson Lock.

The original Moulsford Railway Bridge was built between 1838 and 1840, having been designed by Isambard Kingdom Brunel for the main trunk route of the Great Western Railway. Built to carry a pair of broad gauge tracks across the Thames, it consists of four low semi-elliptical arches spanning the Thames at a considerably skewed angle of 60 degrees. During the 1890s, a second bridge was built immediately parallel to the original structure, enabling the railway to be expanded to a quadruple track configuration. The bridge was subsequently recognised as a Grade II* listed structure. The lines across the structure were electrified during the 2010s.

== Construction ==
=== First bridge ===
The original Moulsford Railway Bridge was built to carry the main line of the Great Western Railway (GWR) over the River Thames. Construction of this truck line between London and Bristol had been authorised by an Act of Parliament in 1835, with construction commencing during the following year. The bridge, along with many of the railway's engineering features, was designed by the accomplished engineer Isambard Kingdom Brunel, who was the leading figure in the GWR's engineering and management.

The bridge, which was built to carry a pair of broad gauge tracks, was a relatively ambitious design, consisting of four elliptical skew arches of 62 feet (19 m) span and a headway height of 21 feet 8 inches (6.60 m). Consisting primarily of red brick with Bath stone quoins, it is skewed at an angle of 60 degrees to the river. The structure has often been regarded as being of an exceptional size for the era; to better accommodate such dimensions, Brunel incorporated a series of internal longitudinal walls and voids to lighten the superstructure, which also reduced the cost and time needed to construct it. It has been alleged that the GWR had promised the Bishop of Durham to aesthetically embellish the bridge to mollify his doubts of the scheme. Historic England has observed the bridge to be one of the most impressive structures along the whole length of the railway.

Construction of the Moulsford Railway Bridge occurred between 1838 and 1840, having been built at the same time as several other railway bridges on the line, including those at Maidenhead and Gatehampton; furthermore, design features are shared between these three bridges. Relatively little alterations have been performed to the structure since its original opening to traffic, even the construction of a second bridge alongside did not result in significant changes to the original bridge, the two structures remaining distinct separate identities. Since the building of the second bridge, the first has been often referred to as the 'west' or 'fast' bridge.

=== Second bridge ===
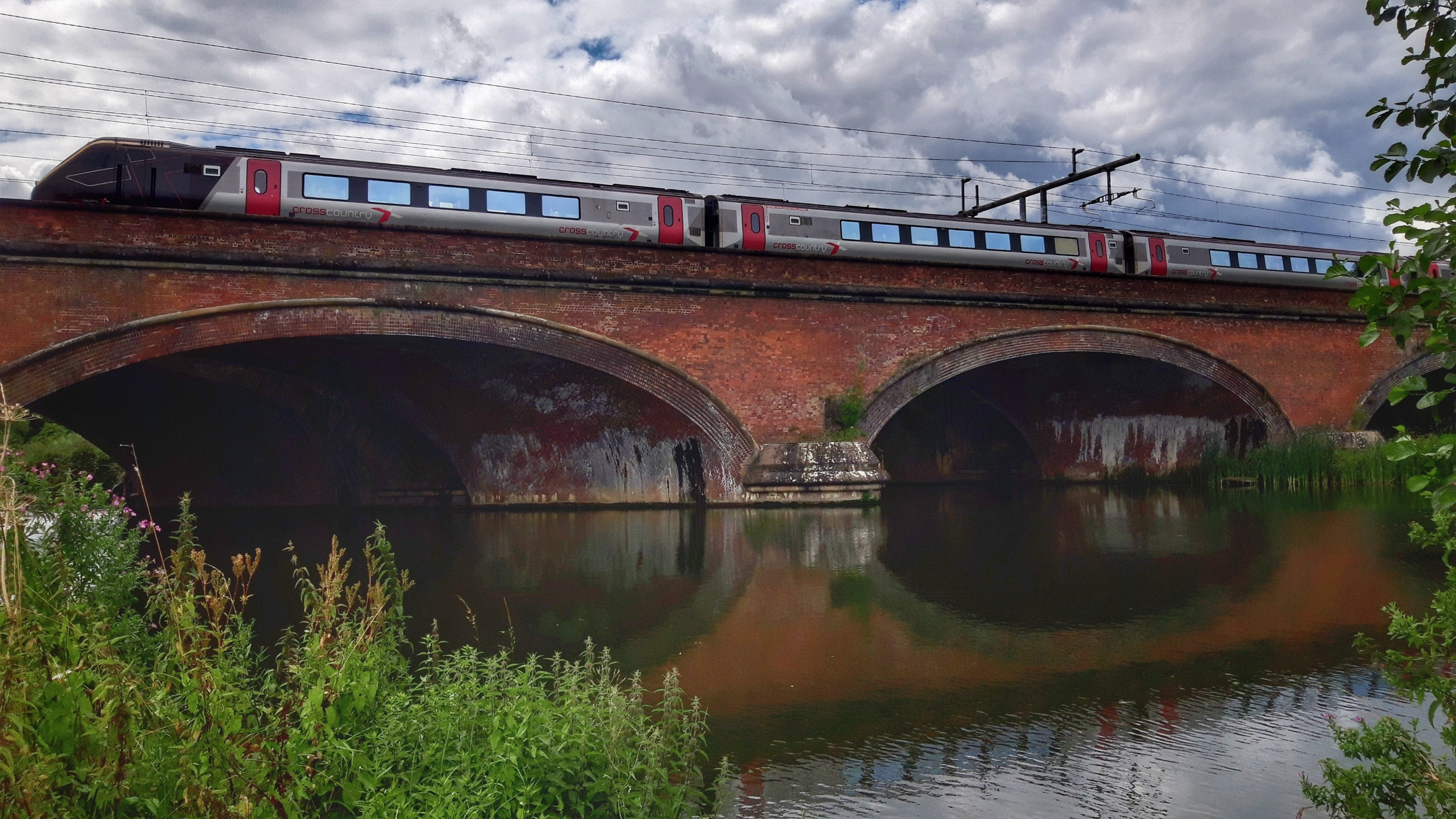
Moulsford Railway Bridge from the upstream side, the newest is closest

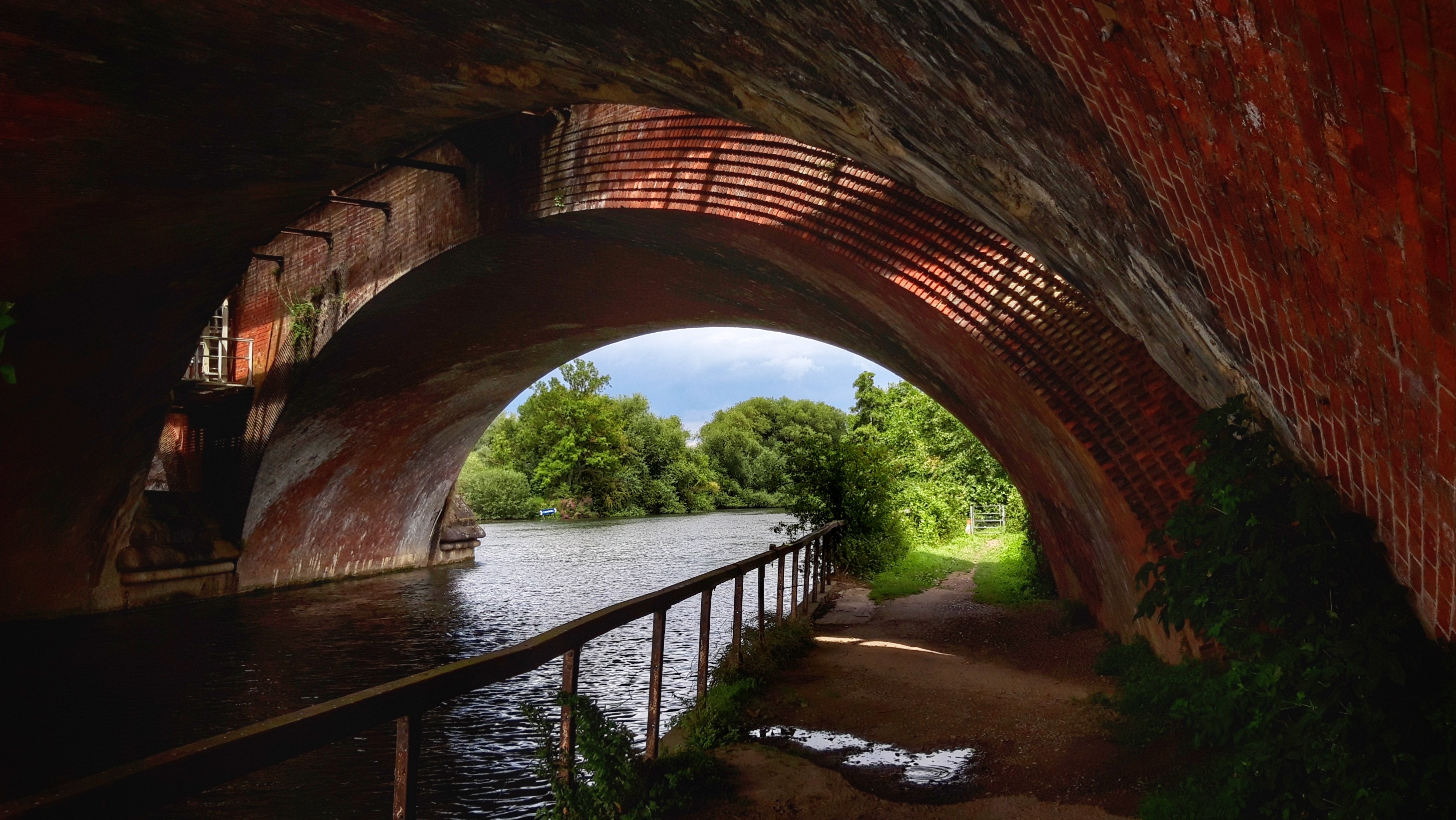
The bridges from underneath; the original is closest

By the 1870s, capacity along the railway was becoming noticeably constrained by a lack of capacity, leading to pressure to widen the line wherever possible. During 1892, the section of the line around the bridge was expanded to a quadruple track arrangement; to accommodate this, the construction of a second bridge was necessary. It was built alongside the upstream side of the original, being connected to it by a series of girders and brick bridgelets. The two bridges are also joined together at the deck level by a series of vaulted brick footbridges.

The design of the second bridge was, like many other structures built for the expansion, was intentionally designed to be sympathetic to Brunel's original bridge; thus, it shares many similarities, such as identical profile and dimensions, to the first bridge. It also has several differences, such as the lack of stone quoins, while the plain uncut bricks form a jagged pattern where they meet the faces of the bridge. The second bridge is also somewhat narrower than the first, having been built to carry a pair of standard gauge tracks.

In relation to the original bridge, it is often referred to as the 'east' or 'relief' bridge. The second bridge has typically been regarded as possessing less intrinsic merit than the first one.

== Alterations ==
During the 1970s, the Great Western Main Line was subject to extensive reengineering work to enable 125 MPH running for the newly introduced Intercity 125 services; accordingly, some changes were made to Moulsford Railway Bridge. Work on constructing safety refuges commenced, despite protection from preservation orders and objections filed by council authorities; British Rail's chief engineering at Reading was allegedly unhappy with the work, resulting in alternative plans being filed and subsequently enacted. Between March and July 2016, national rail infrastructure owner Network Rail commissioned contractors to perform repairs and cleaning activities to the two bridges; this involved the temporary staged closure of each arch to river traffic.

During the 2010s, the railway lines crossing the bridge were electrified, requiring the installation of 25 kV 50 Hz AC OHLE across the structure. Members of the public voiced concerns over the aesthetic impact of such modifications to the structure; for its part, Network Rail commissioned studies into minimising the visual impact of the electrification effort.

== See also ==
- Crossings of the River Thames
- List of railway bridges and viaducts in the United Kingdom

Next crossing upstream	River Thames	Next crossing downstream
Winterbrook Bridge	Moulsford Railway Bridge; Grid reference SU5953984714	Goring and Streatley Bridge
