= Janet Hurst =

British microbiologist

Janet Hurst (born c. 1947) is a British microbiologist, editor and science educator. She worked for the Society for General Microbiology (now the Microbiology Society) for twenty years (1990–2010), including as managing editor of its magazine Microbiology Today (1997–2010) and deputy chief executive officer. On her retirement, she was elected an honorary member of the society.

== Career ==
Born in around 1947, she was raised in Derbyshire, and attended the University of Nottingham, gaining BSc, MSc and MA degrees in biochemistry and microbiology. Hurst then worked in the food industry before joining the Society for General Microbiology (SGM) in 1990, initially in the role of professional affairs assistant. Soon after joining, she started to write for the society's quarterly magazine, SGM Quarterly, and was appointed its managing editor in 1997; in 2000 the magazine was renamed Microbiology Today. She developed the society's educational initiatives, and oversaw the membership and meeting departments, organising more than fifty microbiology conferences and other events during her career. At her retirement in May 2010, she was the SGM's deputy chief executive officer, and her role was replaced by three separate new positions.

From 1991 until at least 2008 she was additionally secretary of the Microbiology in Schools Advisory Committee (MiSAC). As part of a collaboration between the SGM and MiSAC, in 2002, Hurst co-edited a teaching resource on microbiological experiments for British secondary schools with John Grainger from the University of Reading, as well as co-editing Basic Practical Microbiology: A Manual (2001; with Grainger and Dariel Burdass).

In 2010 Hurst was elected an honorary member of the SGM, an accolade for "distinguished microbiologists who have made a significant contribution to the science"; her profile states that her educational work in the field of microbiology had "a national and international impact."

== Personal life ==
She married Mike Hurst soon after her degree; they have two children. Since her retirement, she has been active in local groups in the parish of Goring-on-Thames, South Oxfordshire, including the Britain in Bloom committee and the local history society, for which she was awarded freedom of the village in April 2020.

== Publications ==
- Dariel Anne Burdass, Janet Hurst (ed.). The Good, the Bad and the Ugly: Microbes (Society for General Microbiology; 2009)
- John Grainger, Janet Hurst (eds). Practical Microbiology for Secondary Schools (Society for General Microbiology; 2002)
- John Grainger, Janet Hurst, Dariel Burdass (eds). Basic Practical Microbiology: A Manual (Society for General Microbiology; 2001)
