= Streatley Warren =

Protected area in Berkshire, England

- Site of Special Scientific Interest
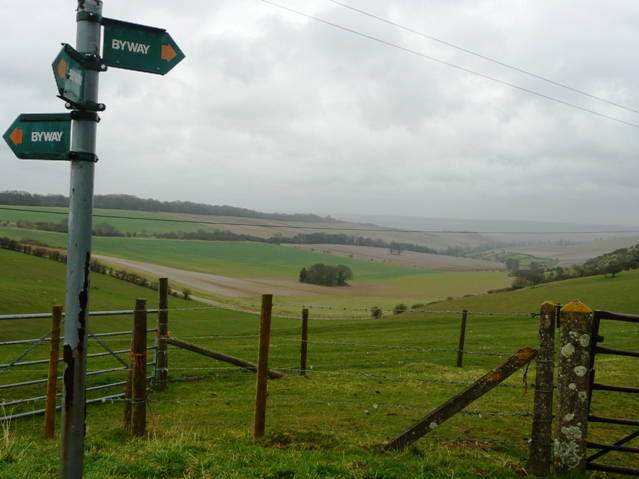

- Location within Berkshire
- Location of Streatley Warren.
- Area of search: Berkshire
- Grid reference: SU 554 807
- Coordinates: 51.523°N 1.203°W
- Interest: Biological
- Area: 31.3 hectares (77 acres)
- Notification date: 1988
- Location map: Magic Map

Streatley Warren is a 31.3-hectare (77-acre) biological Site of Special Scientific Interest west of Streatley in Berkshire. It is in the North Wessex Downs, which is an Area of Outstanding Natural Beauty.

== Geography ==
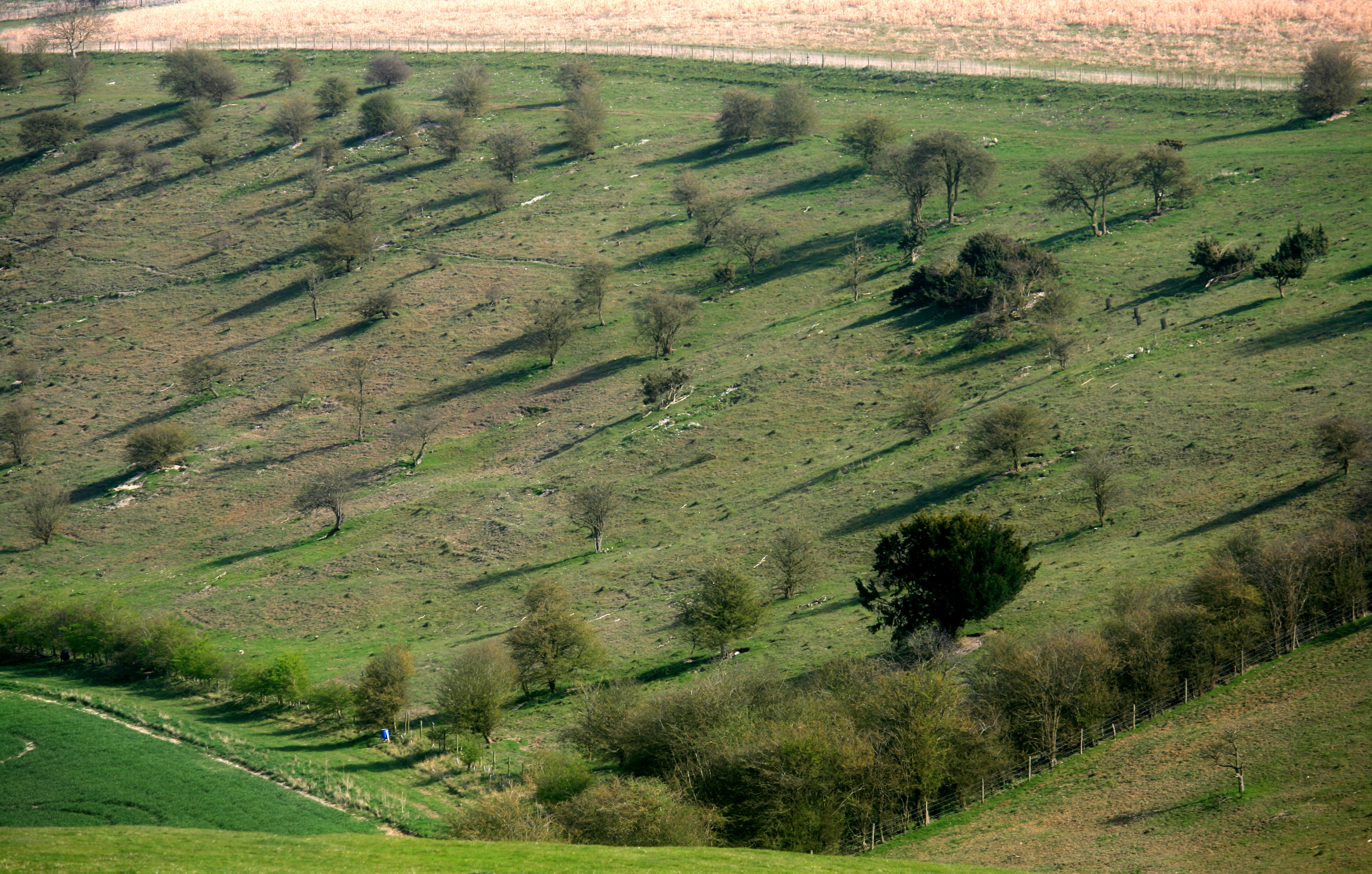
Zoom shot of afternoon sunshine on the sparse woodland on the steep southern slope of the dry valley that forms Streatley Warren.

The site runs along The Ridgeway. The site features terraced land in a dry chalk valley.

== History ==
There is evidence discovered that the terracing formed on the site is of Iron Age creation, when an archaeological dig was started on the site in 1948. It is also believed that Romans continued to use this land for farming. During medieval times the land was used for farming rabbits.

== Access ==
Streatley Warren is open access land, but entry is only allowed between November and February.

== Fauna ==
The site has the following fauna:

=== Birds ===
- Fieldfare
- Red kite
- Raven
- Eurasian skylark
- Grey partridge
- Northern lapwing
- Willow warbler
- Eurasian blackcap
- Lesser whitethroat
- Yellowhammer

=== Mammals ===
- Hare

=== Butterflies ===
- Marbled white
- Small heath
- Common blue

== Flora ==
The site has the following flora:

=== Trees ===
- Crataegus
- Elder
- Rhamnus
- Juniper
- Whitebeam

=== Plants ===
- Coeloglossum
- Gymnadenia conopsea
- Filipendula vulgaris
- Anthyllis vulneraria
- Campanula rotundifolia
- Gentianella anglica
- Festuca rubra
- Festuca ovina
- Briza media
- Helictotrichon pratense
- Koeleria macrantha
- Bromus erectus
- Carex flacca
- Plantago media
- Cirsium acaule
- Leontodon hispidus
- Sanguisorba minor
- Scabiosa columbaria
- Thymus praecox
- Gentianella amarella
- Asperula cynanchica
- Linum catharticum
- Centaurea nigra
- Pimpinella saxifraga
- Origanum vulgare
