= Thomas Rome =

Member of the Queensland Legislative Council
- In office 1 July 1881 – 24 January 1882

Personal details
- Born: Thomas Rome; 1838 England
- Died: 1916 (aged 77–78) Goring-on-Thames, England
- Spouse: Sara Elizabeth Thorn (m.1874)
- Occupation: Pastoralist

Thomas Rome (1838 – 14 May 1916) was a member of the Queensland Legislative Council.

Rome was born in 1838 in England and ventured to Australia in 1863 with his brother, Charles. He gained pastoral experience working in Taabinga before becoming an overseer on the Darling Downs. By 1869 he had purchased Northampton Downs and Welford Downs in Barcoo but sold some of his property to buy Terrick station. His final purchase was the Venture property in the South Gregory area of Queensland in 1877.

Appointed to the Queensland Legislative Council in July 1881, Rome served for just six months before resigning in January 1882, selling his properties, and returning to England.

Power was married to Sara Elizabeth Thorn in 1874 and together they had two children. He died in Goring-on-Thames, England in 1916.
