= Goring & Streatley Golf Club =

Golf course in Berkshire, England

Coordinates: 51.52296°N 1.1628°W

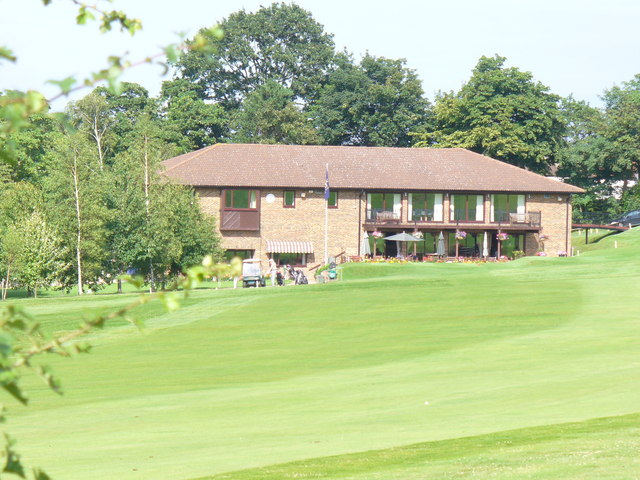
The clubhouse

Goring & Streatley Golf Club is a golf course in the village of Streatley, in the English county of Berkshire. It takes its name partly from that village, and partly from the adjoining village of Goring-on-Thames in the county of Oxfordshire. The course adjoins the National Trust properties of Lardon Chase, the Holies and Lough Down.

The club has an 18-hole 6,355-yard (5,811 m), par-71 golf course, which has magnificent views of the Thames, the Goring Gap and the Ridgeway. It was established in 1895 and is famous for producing touring professional Carl Mason.

The course was designed by Harry Colt, who also designed courses such as; Stoke Park, Sunningdale, Muirfield, Hoylake and Wentworth.

The Pro Shop is run by the JD Gold Academy which currently also runs Drayton Park, Carswell and The Springs. The Club Professional is Lyle Hastie.

Apart from golf, the club runs a successful restaurant called Woodlands which holds Sunday lunches every Sunday and has the capacity to cater for large functions, including weddings and funerals.
