= Goring Lock =

Lock and weir on the River Thames in Oxfordshire, England

Coordinates: 51.52298°N 1.14235°W

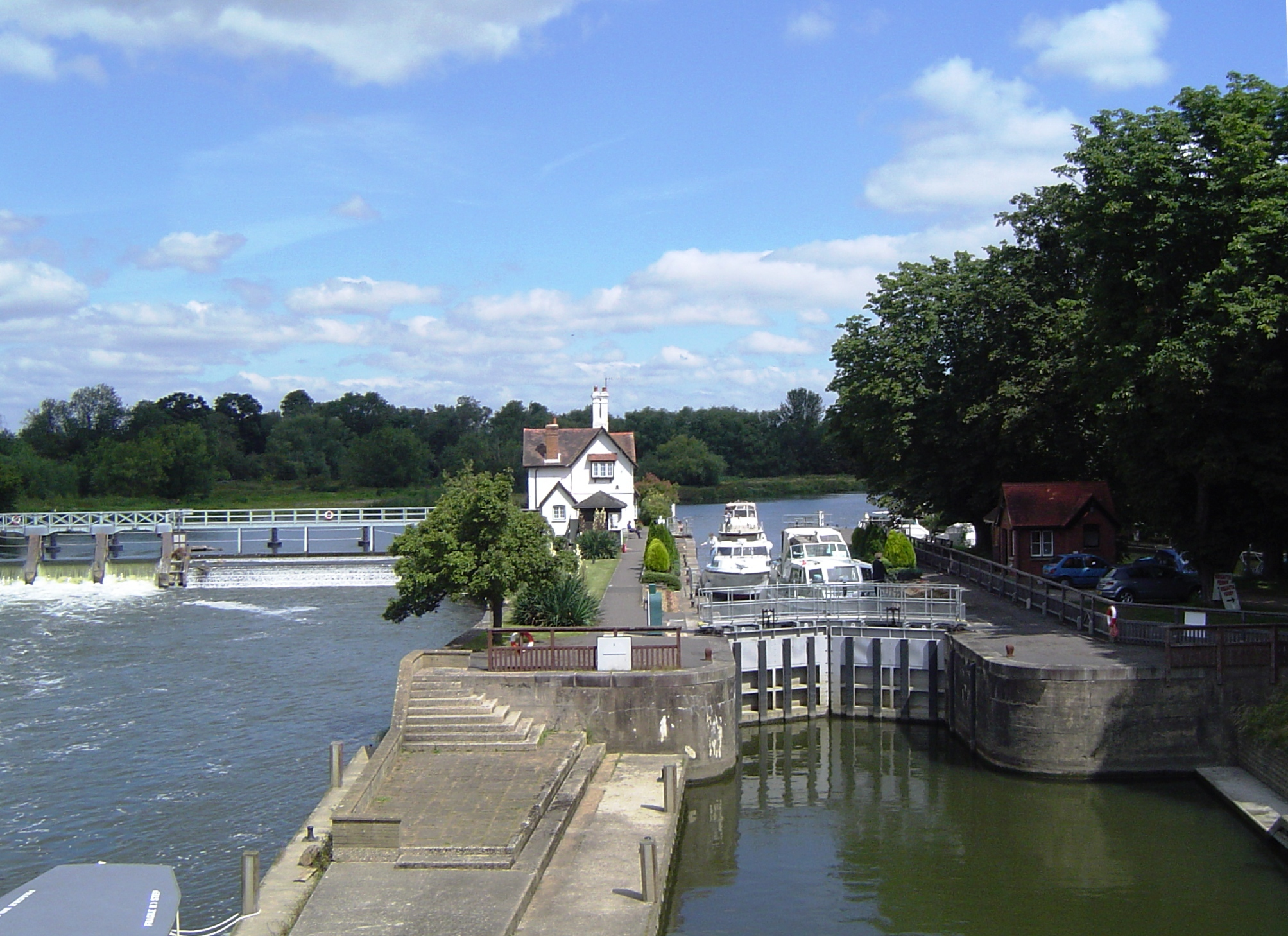
- The view of Goring Lock from Goring and Streatley Bridge
- Waterway: River Thames
- County: Oxfordshire
- Maintained by: Environment Agency
- Operation: Hydraulic
- First built: 1787
- Latest built: 1921
- Length: 54.68 m (179 ft 5 in)
- Width: 6.40 m (21 ft 0 in)
- Fall: 1.77 m (5 ft 10 in)
- Above sea level: 136'
- Distance to Teddington Lock: 65 miles
- Power is available out of hours

Goring Lock is a lock and weir situated on the River Thames in England at the Goring Gap in the Chiltern Hills. The lock is located on the Oxfordshire bank at Goring-On-Thames, with Streatley, Berkshire on the opposite side of the river. It is just upstream of Goring and Streatley Bridge. The lock was first built in 1787 by the Thames Navigation Commissioners

The weir runs back to an island under the bridge and then another weir goes from there to the Streatley bank.

== History ==
There was originally a weir and ferry here belonging to Goring Priory, which became the property of millers who kept a flash lock. A report in a newspaper of 1674 tells how 60 people drowned in the lock when the ferryman rowed too close to it. The pound lock was built in August 1787 from oak. Over several decades operation of the lock appears to have been shared with that of Cleeve Lock until 1869. Following this there were plans to build a lock-house, but this was not started until 1879. The lock itself was replaced in 1886. In the last rebuild in 1921 the lock had intermediate gates installed, making two pounds, but these were removed in the refit in 2003.

== Access to the lock ==
The lock is situated almost under the bridge and is easily accessible from both Goring and Streatley

== Reach above the lock ==
The reach is only just over half a mile long. The Cleeve side of the river is occupied by large gardens stretching down the hillside with several boat-houses on the river. There are islands below Cleeve lock, with weirs between them, and these extend for some distance. On the Streatley side are meadows and woods.

The Thames Path, having crossed Goring Bridge to Streatley, continues through on the western bank to Cleeve Lock.

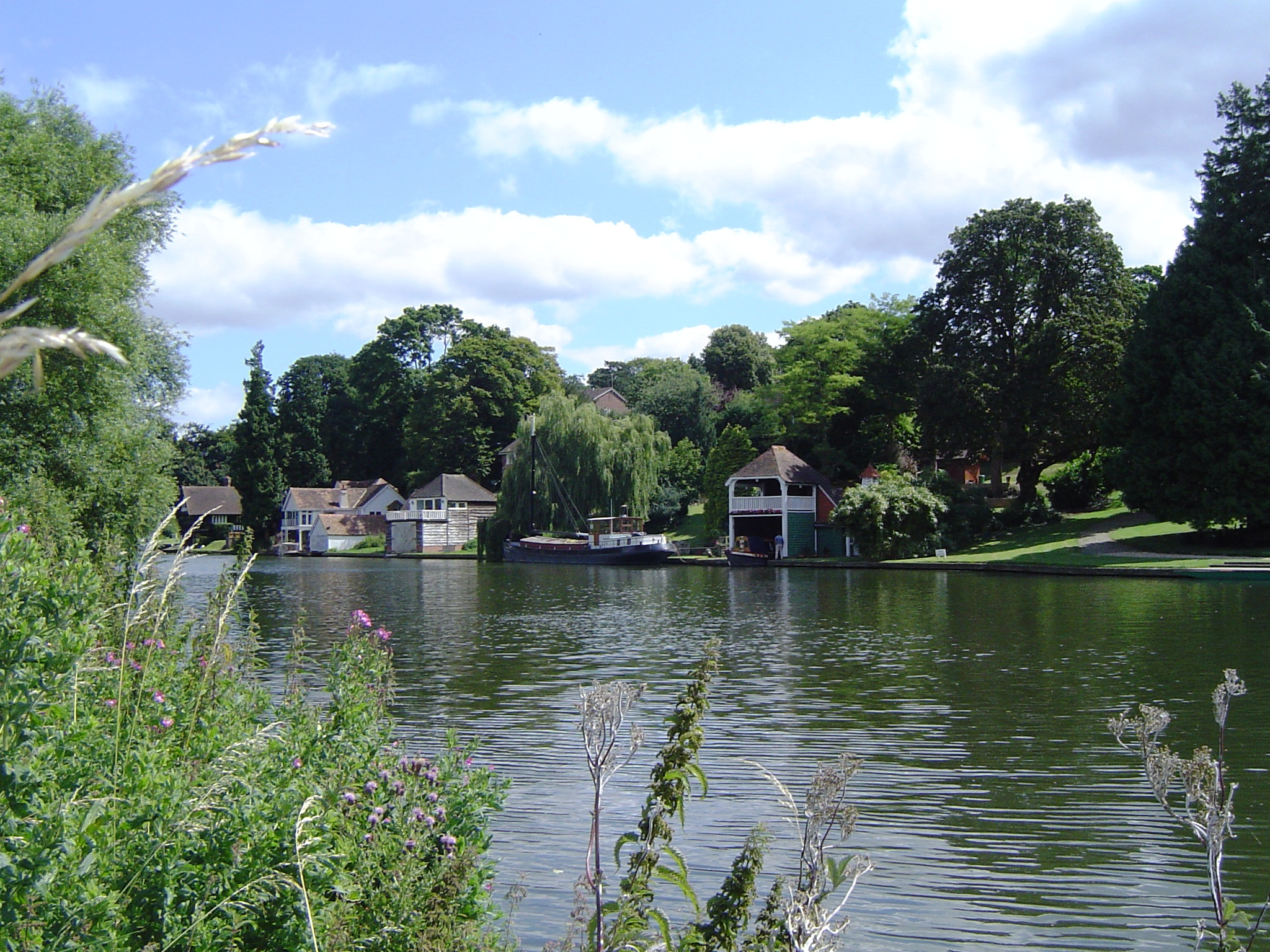
Boat houses along the Cleeve side

== Views of the lock and the weirs ==
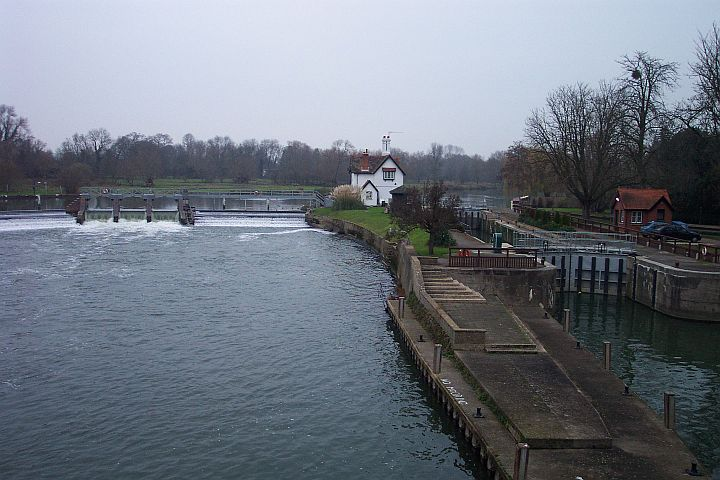
The lock and weir in winter

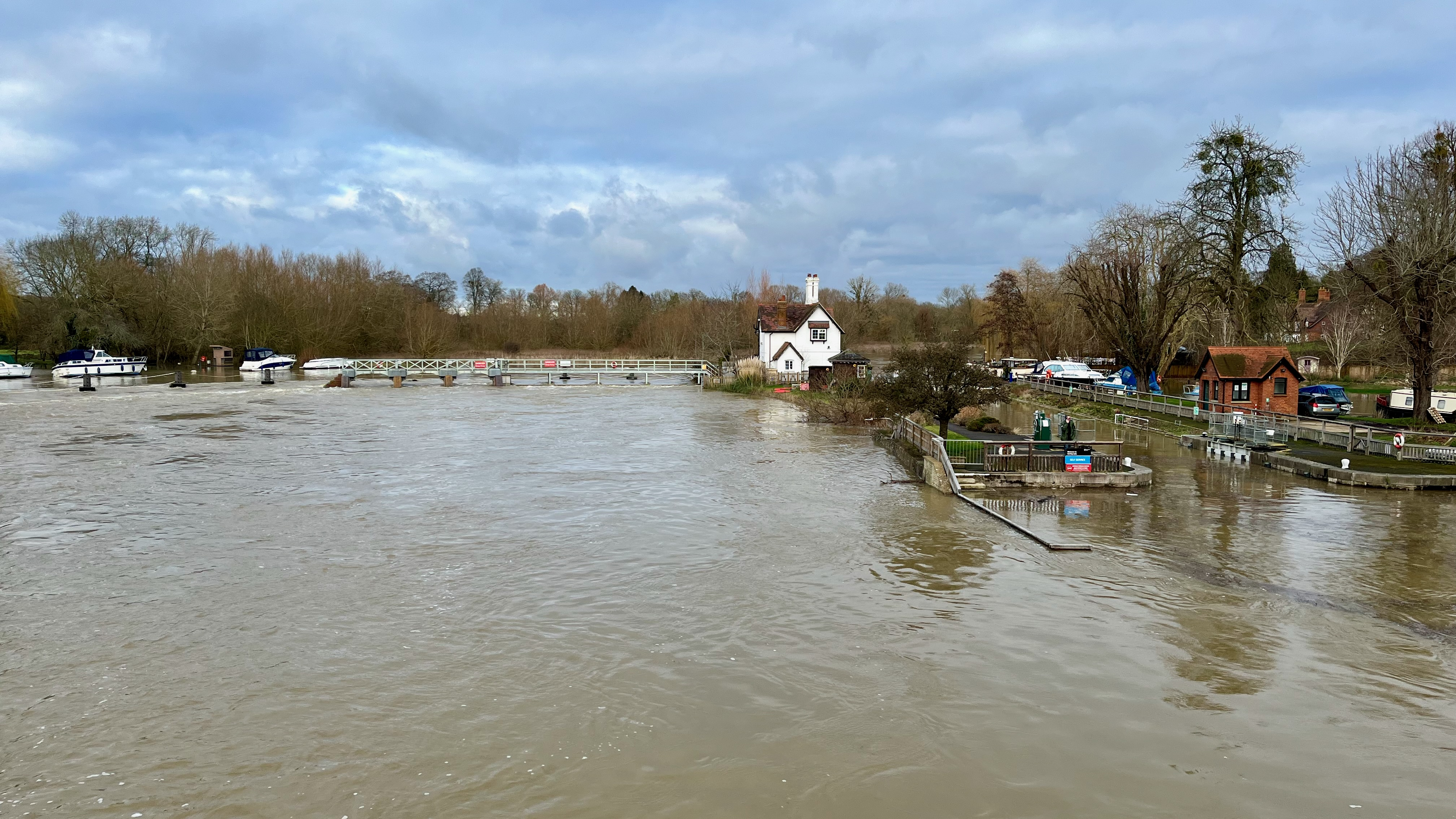
Flooding at Goring Lock, River Thames, UK

== See also ==
- Locks on the River Thames

Next lock upstream	River Thames	Next lock downstream
Cleeve Lock; 1.00 km (0.62 mi)	Goring Lock; Grid reference: SU596808	Whitchurch Lock; 6.55 km (4.07 mi)
