= Pangbourne railway station =

Railway station in the village of Pangbourne, Berkshire, England

Pangbourne
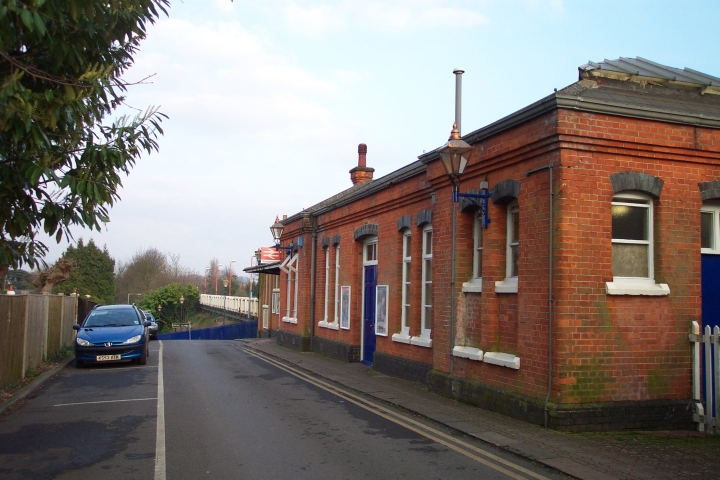
- Station buildings from access road

General information
- Location: Pangbourne, District of West Berkshire; England
- Coordinates: 51°29′07.08″N 1°05′24.00″W
- Grid reference: SU632766
- Managed by: Great Western Railway
- Platforms: 2
- Tracks: 4

Other information
- Station code: PAN
- Classification: DfT category E

History
- Original company: Great Western Railway
- Pre-grouping: Great Western Railway
- Post-grouping: Great Western Railway

Key dates
- 1 June 1840: Station opened

Passengers
- 2020/21: ▼94,750
- 2021/22: ▲0.252 million
- 2022/23: ▲0.321 million
- 2023/24: ▲0.353 million
- 2024/25: ▲0.374 million
Location
Notes
- Passenger statistics from the Office of Rail and Road

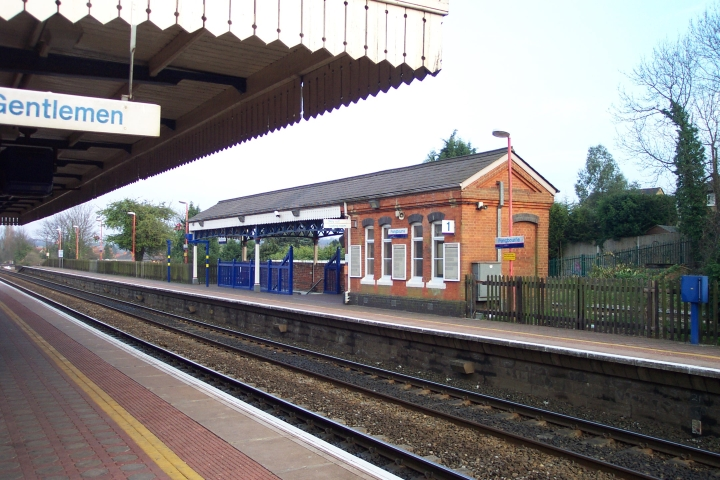
Platforms; note fast lines passing behind platform 1

Pangbourne railway station serves the village of Pangbourne in the county of Berkshire, and across the River Thames the village of Whitchurch-on-Thames, in Oxfordshire. It is 41 miles 43 chains (66.8 km) down the line from London Paddington and is situated between Tilehurst to the east and Goring & Streatley to the west. The station is served by local services operated by Great Western Railway.

Pangbourne station is located close to the village centre, with main station buildings on the opposite side of the railway to the village. It has two platforms, one on each of the relief (slow) lines, whilst the fast lines pass behind the station. The platforms are linked to each other and the station entrance, on the up relief platform, by a pedestrian underpass.

Originally, the station also had platforms (the former 1 & 2) on the main (fast) lines; as such, the current Platforms 1 & 2 were Platforms 3 & 4 respectively. Some signs of their previous existence are still visible adjacent to (the current) Platform 1. A consequence of their removal is that when the relief lines are closed for engineering work, local stopping services cannot call at Pangbourne, and a replacement bus service is required.

== History ==
The station is on the original line of the Great Western Railway, which was opened in stages: the portion between Reading and Steventon opened on 1 June 1840, and Pangbourne was the first station out of Reading.

== Services ==
All services at Pangbourne are operated by Great Western Railway using Class 387 EMUs.

The typical off-peak is two trains per hour in each direction between London Paddington and Didcot Parkway. On Sundays, the service is reduced to hourly in each direction.

Preceding station	National Rail	Following station
Tilehurst	Great Western Railway Great Western Main Line Stopping Services	Goring & Streatley
