= Streatley, Berkshire =

Thames-side village, Berkshire, England

Coordinates: 51°31′23″N 1°09′00″W

Streatley
- Village and civil parish
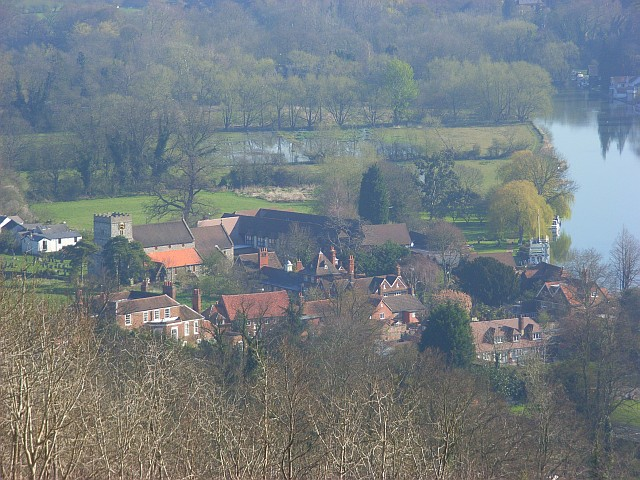
- Streatley nucleus and riverside beyond.

- Location within Berkshire
- Area: 13.14 km^{2} (5.07 sq mi)
- Population: 1,060 (2011 census)
  - Density: 81/km^{2} (210/sq mi)
- OS grid reference: SU5980
- Civil parish: Streatley
- Unitary authority: West Berkshire
- Ceremonial county: Berkshire
- Region: South East
- Country: England
- Sovereign state: United Kingdom
- Post town: Reading
- Postcode district: RG8
- Dialling code: 01491
- Police: Thames Valley
- Fire: Royal Berkshire
- Ambulance: South Central
- UK Parliament: Newbury
- Website: Streatley Parish Council

Streatley is a village and civil parish on the River Thames in Berkshire, England. The village faces Goring-on-Thames. The two places share in their shops, services, leisure, sports and much of their transport. Across the river is Goring & Streatley railway station and the village cluster adjoins a lock and weir. The west of the village is a mixture of agriculture and woodland plus a golf course. The village has a riverside hotel. Much of Streatley is at steeply varying elevations, ranging from 51 to 185 m (167 to 607 ft) above ordnance datum (AOD) at Streatley Warren, a hilltop point on its western border forming the eastern end of the Berkshire Downs. This Area of Outstanding Natural Beauty is topped by the 87 mi (140 km) The Ridgeway path, which crosses the Thames at Goring and Streatley Bridge.

== Location ==
Streatley is centred 9 mi (14 km) north-west of Reading and 17 mi (27 km) south of Oxford. Its developed area occupies half of the narrow Goring Gap on the River Thames and is directly across the river from the Oxfordshire village of Goring-on-Thames. The two villages are connected by Goring and Streatley Bridge, with its adjacent lock and weir, and are often considered as a single settlement. Goring & Streatley railway station on the Great Western Main Line is in Goring and serves both villages.^{[A ]}^{[B ]}

The village is mostly surrounded by National Trust land: Lardon Chase, the Holies and Lough Down. Nearby villages include Aldworth, Goring-on-Thames, Lower Basildon, Moulsford and Pangbourne The Ridgeway long-distance path passes through the village, which is the finishing line for the annual "Ridgeway 40" walk and trail run. The Thames Path, Icknield Way and the Ridgeway cross the Thames at Streatley.

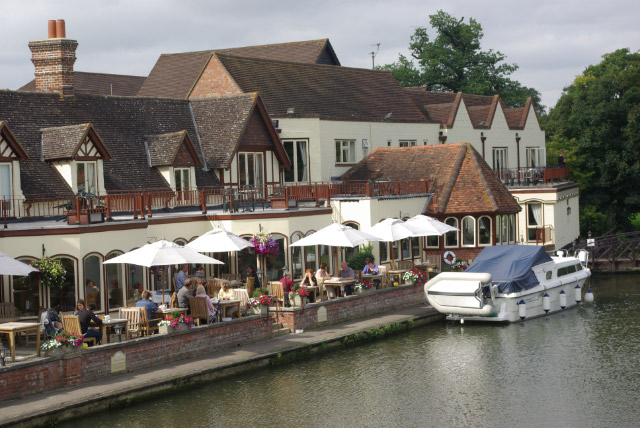
The Swan hotel

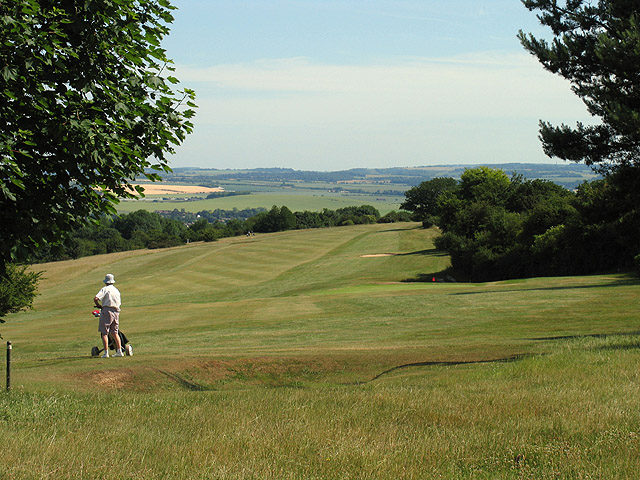
Part of Golf Club course and agricultural and wooded hills with footpaths in background.

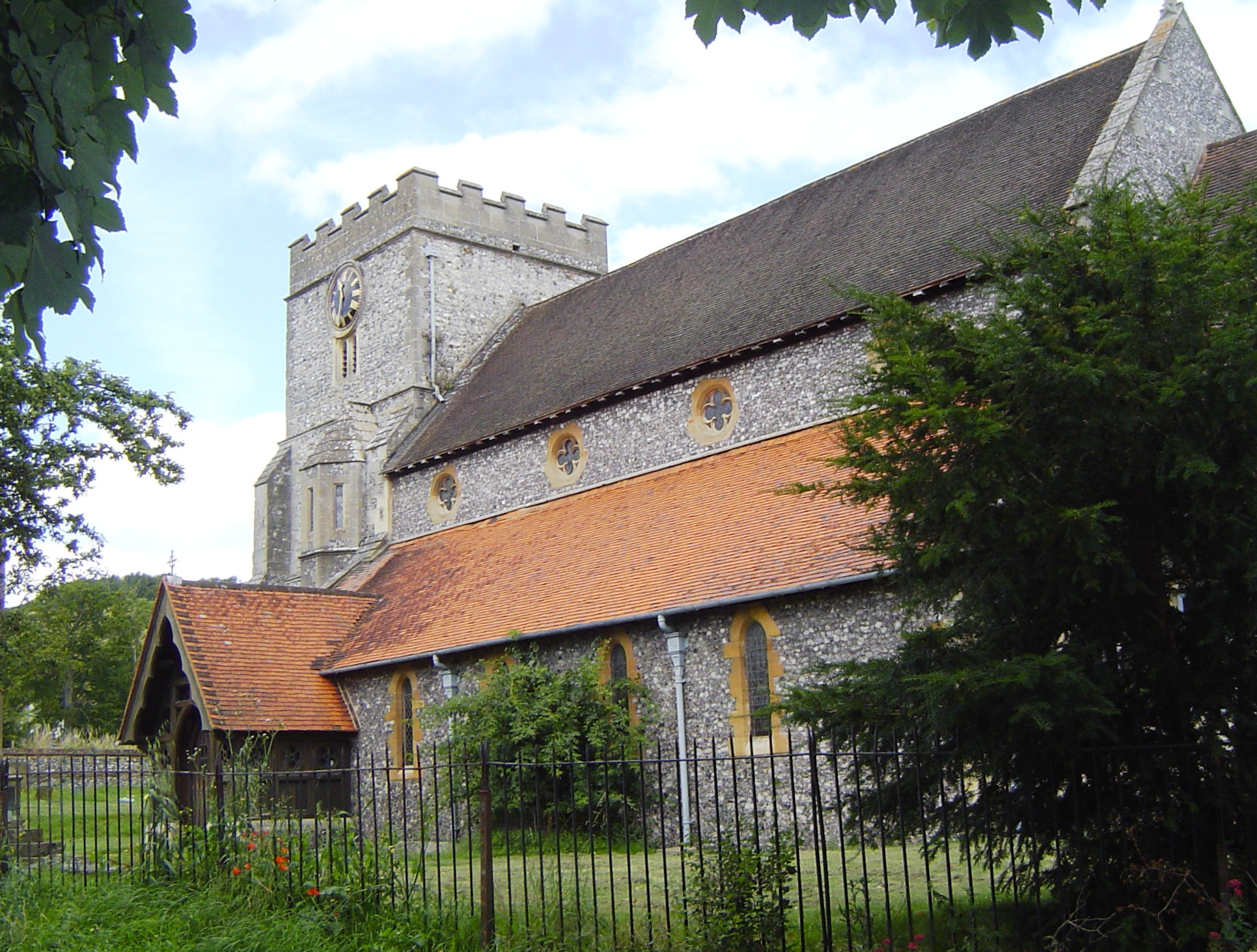
St. Mary's parish church

== History ==
Being in such a vital crossing point on the Thames, a settlement at Streatley has existed for a long time. The village is mentioned in the Domesday Book. Neolithic tools have been found at the base of Lough Down and Bronze Age artefacts in the village. A sarsen stone, traditionally thought to be the remains of a Roman milestone, is still present at the Bull crossroads. Long before the bridge was built a ferry used to operate between the two villages. Sixty people were drowned at Streatley in 1674 when a ferry capsized in the flash lock. The iron wheel pump, on the forecourt of The Bull, was the only reliable water source in the great freeze of 1895, and water was sold from this point for sixpence a bucket.

Two-thirds of Streatley used to be owned by the Morrell family of brewers from Oxford, whose resistance to change enabled the village to withstand the railway line and extra houses that went to Goring-on-Thames. The watermill was originally owned by the nuns of Goring. In later years it was used to drive a generator to provide electricity for the estate. However, it burned down in 1926 and was not rebuilt. On the death of Emily Morrell, in 1938, the estate was sold, and the manor house and some other houses in the village became part of the Royal Veterinary College, which had moved out of London during The Blitz. The college left in 1958. A bomb exploded in a postman's bag on a bicycle in the village in 1979. It was targeted at a retired judge in the village, but went off early, when the postman's bicycle fell over. The incident appeared to be the work of the IRA.

== Government ==
Streatley is a civil parish with an elected parish council. Besides the riverside village of Streatley, the parish covers an area of the Berkshire Downs to the west, and includes the small cluster of dwellings named Stichens Green. The parish is bordered to the north and east by the Oxfordshire parishes of Moulsford, South Stoke and Goring. To the west and south, it is bordered by the Berkshire parishes of Basildon, Ashampstead and Aldworth. The parish falls within the area of the unitary authority of West Berkshire. Both the parish council and the unitary authority have responsibilities for various aspects of local government. The parish used to form part of the Newbury parliamentary constituency, but moved to the new constituency of Reading West and Mid Berks in 2024.

== Amenities ==
=== Public house ===
Streatley has one public house, The Bull at Streatley on the Reading Road. Its garden is the unusual burial site for a monk and a nun executed in 1440 for "misconduct" and contains an ancient yew tree. Near the Bull is a youth hostel.

=== Hotel ===
There is a four-star hotel and restaurant in the village – the Swan at Streatley. During the 1970s, it was owned by the drag artist Danny La Rue. The hotel was then purchased by Diplomat Hotels of Sweden, before being sold in 2001 to Nike Group Hotels, part of the Bracknell-based Nike Group of Companies, whose Chairman is John Nike. Since 2012, the hotel has been owned by Rare Bird Hotels, backed by Punch Taverns and Pizza Express entrepreneur Hugh Osmond. The restaurant area is now branded as Coppa Club. During the summer small electric boats can be rented from here to explore the Thames.

=== Leisure facilities ===
Goring and Streatley Golf Club is in the village, founded in 1895. It has a 6,355-yard, par 72 golf course, designed in part by Harry Colt, and has views of the Thames and Ridgeway. Streatley Hill is a destination for cycling hill climbs – the annual Didcot Phoenix Cycle Club and Reading Cycle Club Hill Climb competitions take place every September. The hill featured in the Tour of Britain in 2008 as a designated King of the Mountains climb.

=== Church ===
The Church of England parish church of Saint Mary in Streatley used to be part of the Reading Episcopal Area of the Diocese of Oxford, but has now moved to the Dorchester Episcopal Area, crossing the old Wessex-Mercia boundary for the first time in 1400 years. In the churchyard is the grave of an Anglo-Saxon warrior, whose body was discovered under the old bowling green in 1932 and reburied in the cemetery. The village has a Church of England primary school with a feeder pre-school attached to it. The church is a Grade II listed building.

=== Events ===
The annual Goring and Streatley Regatta was held each July on the Streatley side of the river. In the 19th century, it was a serious regatta to rival Henley or Marlow, but changed to a local regatta for amateur teams of inhabitants of the two villages. It came to a halt after COVID.

A torchlight procession of villagers and visitors merges with another stream from Goring each Christmas Eve, in a night-time spectacle that continues onto Streatley Recreation Ground for a carol service.

There is a biannual Arts Festival called the Goring Gap Festival.

== In literature ==
The village is the subject of the poem "A Streatley Sonata" by Joseph Ashby-Sterry composed in the late 19th century:

And when you're here, I’m told that you

Should mount the hill and see the view;
And gaze and wonder, if you'd do
Its merits most completely;

The air is clear, the day is fine,
The prospect is, I know, divine –
But most distinctly I decline
To climb the hill at Streatley

But from the Hill, I understand
You gaze across rich pasture-land;
And fancy you see Oxford and
P'r'aps Wallingford and Wheatley:

Upon the winding Thames you gaze,
And, though the view’s beyond all praise,
I'd rather much sit here and laze

Than scale the Hill at Streatley!

The village is mentioned in Jerome K Jerome's Three Men in a Boat:

We had intended to push on to Wallingford that day, but the sweet smiling face of the river here lured us to linger for a while; and so we left our boat at the bridge, and went up into Streatley, and lunched at the Bull, much to Montmorency's satisfaction....
It is an ancient place, Streatley, dating back, like most river-side towns and villages, to British and Saxon times. Goring is not nearly so pretty a little spot to stop at as Streatley, if you have your choice; but it is passing fair enough in its way, and is nearer the railway in case you want to slip off without paying your hotel bill.

== See also ==
- List of places in Berkshire
- List of civil parishes in England
- Lardon Chase, the Holies and Lough Down

== Sources ==
- Page, W.H.; Ditchfield, P.H., eds. (1923). A History of the County of Berkshire, Volume 3. Victoria County History. pp. 511–516.
- Pevsner, Nikolaus (1966). Berkshire. The Buildings of England. Harmondsworth: Penguin Books. p. 230.
- ^{A} Ordnance Survey (1999). OS Explorer Map 170 – Abingdon, Wantage & Vale of White Horse. ISBN 0-319-21794-9.
- ^{B} Ordnance Survey (1999). OS Explorer Map 171 – Chiltern Hills West, Henley-on-Thames & Wallingford. ISBN 0-319-21795-7.
