= Goring & Streatley railway station =

Railway station in Oxfordshire, England

Coordinates: 51°31′19.20″N 1°08′0.60″W

Goring & Streatley
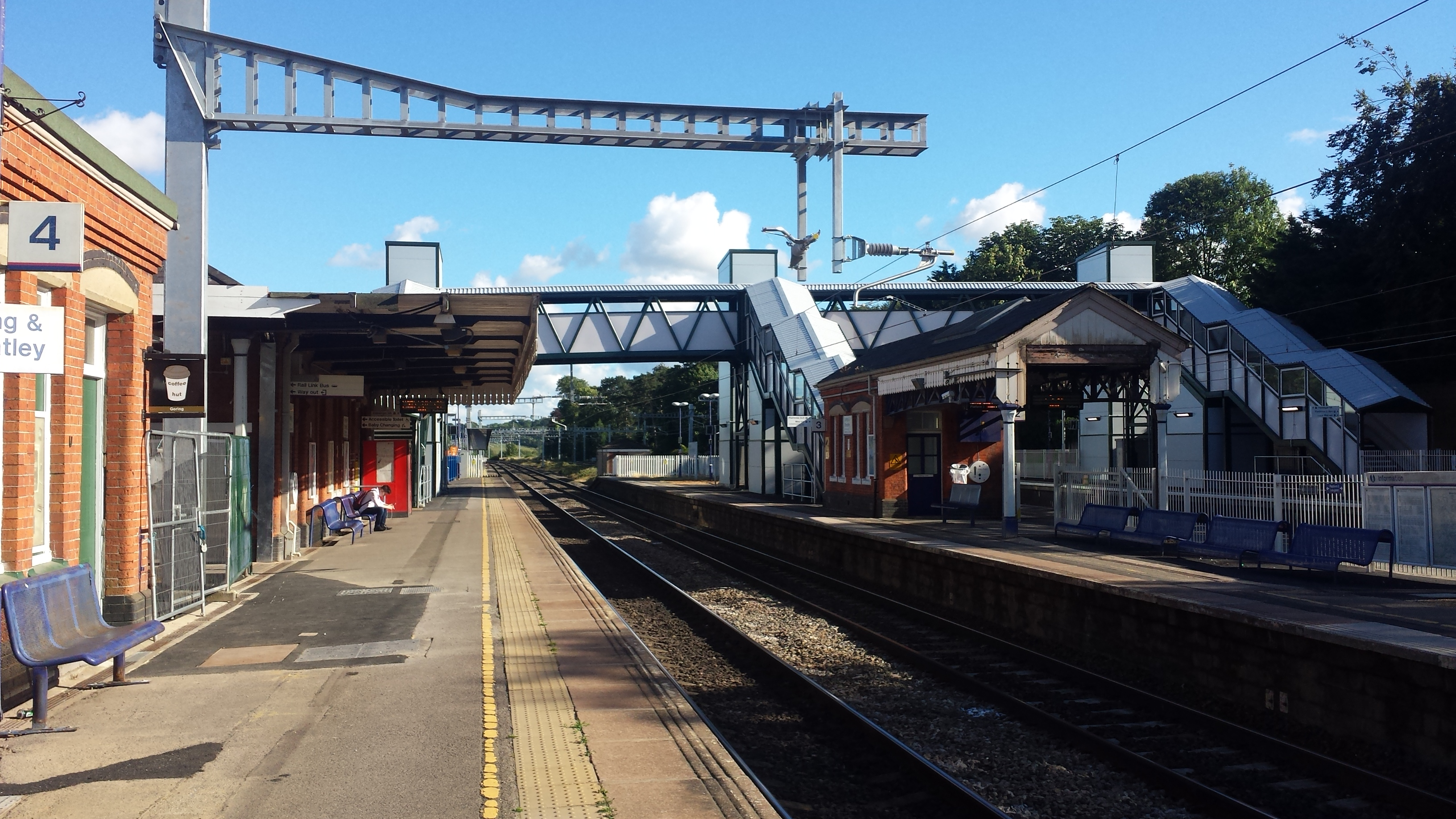
- The station with the new footbridge and electrification in progress

General information
- Location: Goring-on-Thames, District of South Oxfordshire; England
- Grid reference: SU602806
- Managed by: Great Western Railway
- Platforms: 4

Other information
- Station code: GOR
- Classification: DfT category E

History
- Opened: 1 June 1840
- Original company: Great Western Railway
- Pre-grouping: Great Western Railway
- Post-grouping: Great Western Railway

Key dates
- 1 June 1840: GWR Reading to Steventon opened
- 1 June 1840: Opened as Goring
- 9 November 1895: Renamed Goring & Streatley

Passengers
- 2020/21: ▼82,368
- 2021/22: ▲0.229 million
- 2022/23: ▲0.288 million
- 2023/24: ▲0.322 million
- 2024/25: ▲0.360 million
Location
Notes
- Passenger statistics from the Office of Rail and Road

Goring & Streatley railway station is on the Great Western Main Line, serving the twin villages of Goring-on-Thames in Oxfordshire and Streatley in Berkshire. The station is located in Goring-on-Thames, adjacent to the village centre, and is five minutes' walk from Goring and Streatley Bridge; this connects the village with Streatley, across the River Thames. It is 44 miles 60 chains (72.0 km) down the line from London Paddington and is situated between Pangbourne to the east and Cholsey to the west. It is served by local services operated by Great Western Railway (GWR)

== Layout ==
The station has two side platforms (platform 1 on the down main line and platform 4 on the up relief line) and a central island platform with two faces (platform 2 on the up main line and platform 3 on the down relief line). Platforms 1 and 2 are only used when engineering works cause stopping trains to use the fast tracks and the platform edges are closed off by fences incorporating normally closed (but not locked) gates.

The main station building is to the east of the station, alongside platform 4 and on the opposite side of the station to the village centre. There is a large car park to the south of the station building. There are also two pedestrian entrances onto platform 1, one of which links directly to Goring village centre. Access between the platforms is via a footbridge, accessed by steps and lifts from all platforms.

== History ==
The station was on the original line of the Great Western Railway, on the section between Reading and Steventon that opened on 1 June 1840. Originally named Goring, the station was located between Pangbourne and Moulsford stations. In 1892, Moulsford station was closed and replaced by the current Cholsey station. Goring station was renamed Goring & Streatley on 9 November 1895 to prevent confusion with Goring-By-Sea.

Preparation for the electrification of the line between Paddington and Bristol/Oxford required raised clearances and hence the replacement of the old footbridge. Following a strong local campaign led by the mobility group MIGGS (Mobility Issues Group for Goring and Streatley), Network Rail included lifts in the new footbridge, which was opened in June 2016. These changes also resulted in the demolition of the former ladies waiting room and toilet block on the island platform. The ticket office, toilets and waiting rooms are only open when the station is staffed in the mornings (Mondays to Saturdays). There is a bus stop in the road immediately outside the ticket office, with local buses running to Cleeve, South & North Stoke and Wallingford (Mondays to Saturdays) operated by Going Forward Buses CIC.

== Services ==
All services at Goring & Streatley are operated by Great Western Railway using Class 387 EMUs.

The typical off-peak is two trains per hour in each direction between London Paddington and Didcot Parkway. On Sundays, the service is reduced to hourly in each direction.

Preceding station	National Rail	Following station
Pangbourne	Great Western Railway Great Western Main Line Stopping Services	Cholsey
	Historical railways	
Pangbourne Line and station open	Great Western Railway Great Western Main Line	Moulsford Line open, station closed

== Gallery ==
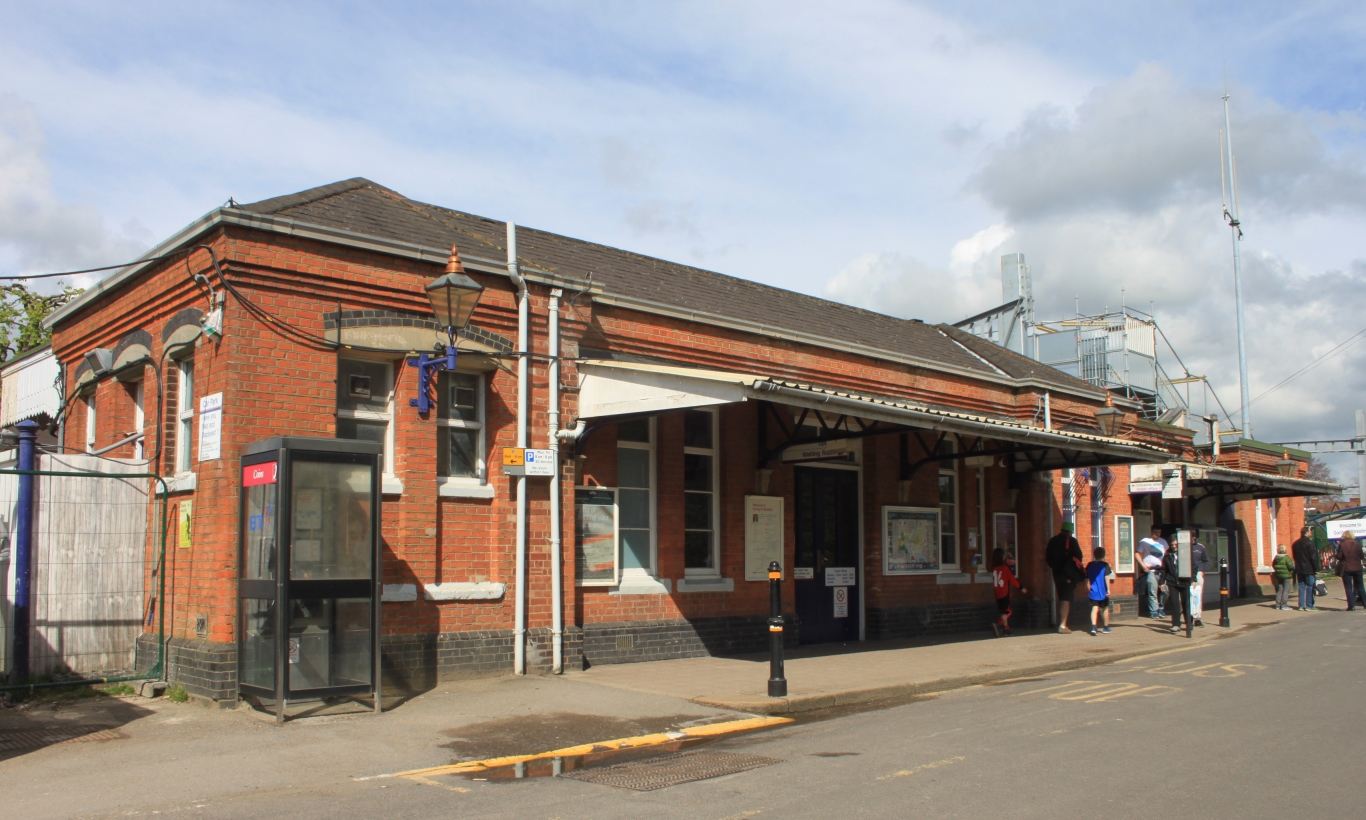
Main entrance to Goring & Streatley station

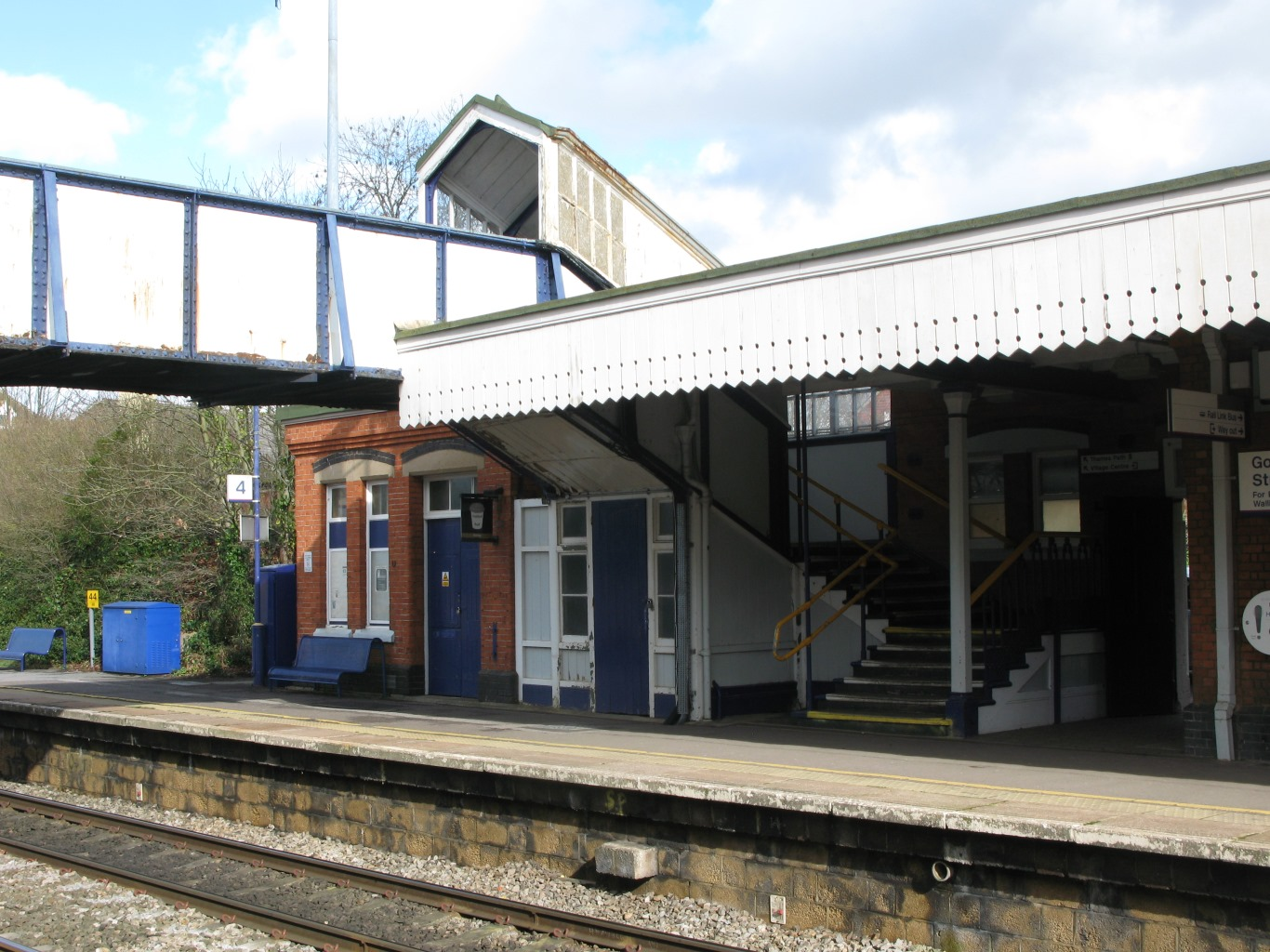
The old footbridge and stairs on platform 4; bridge and stairs since demolished

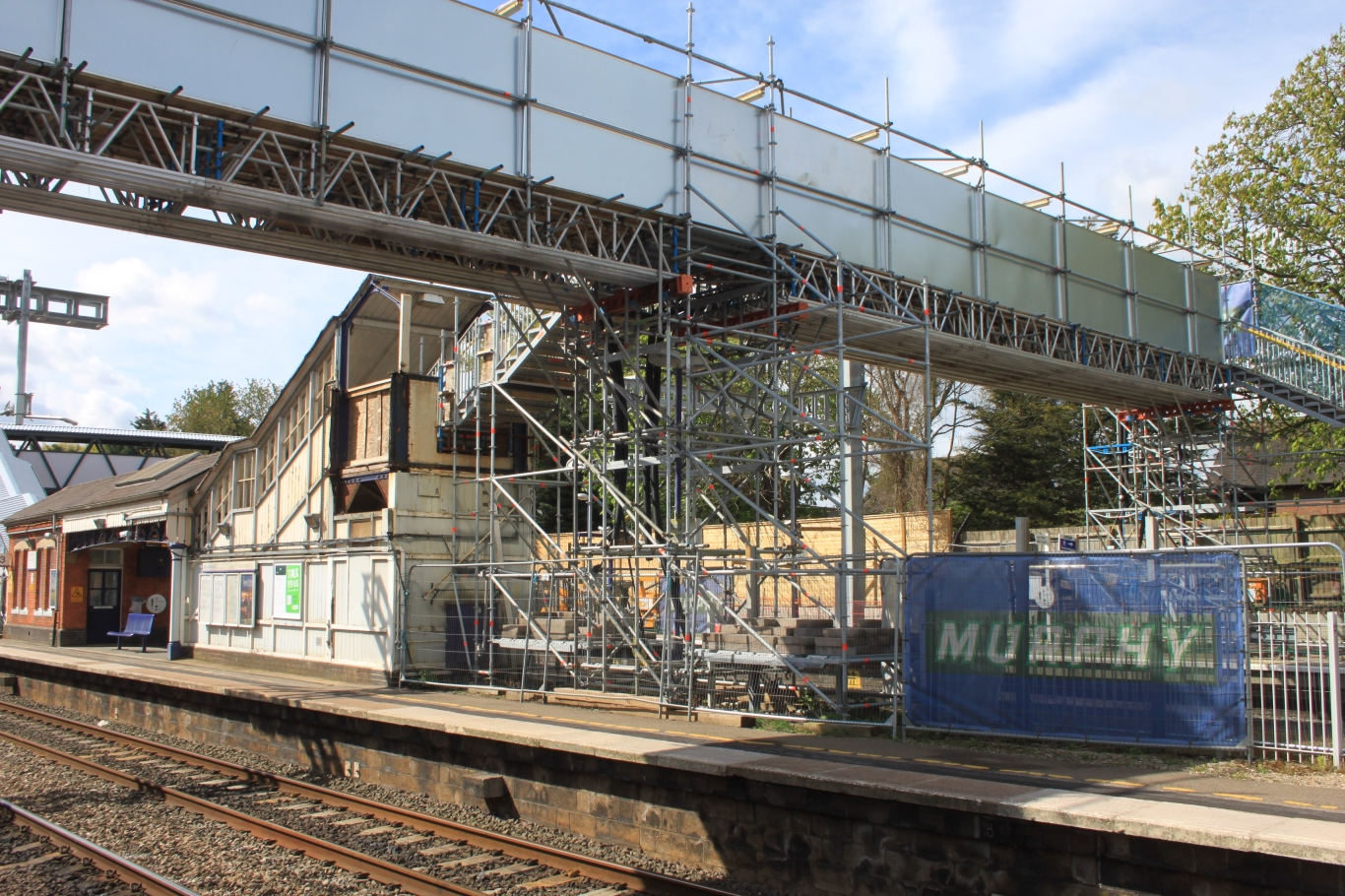
The temporary footbridge used between demolition of old and build of new

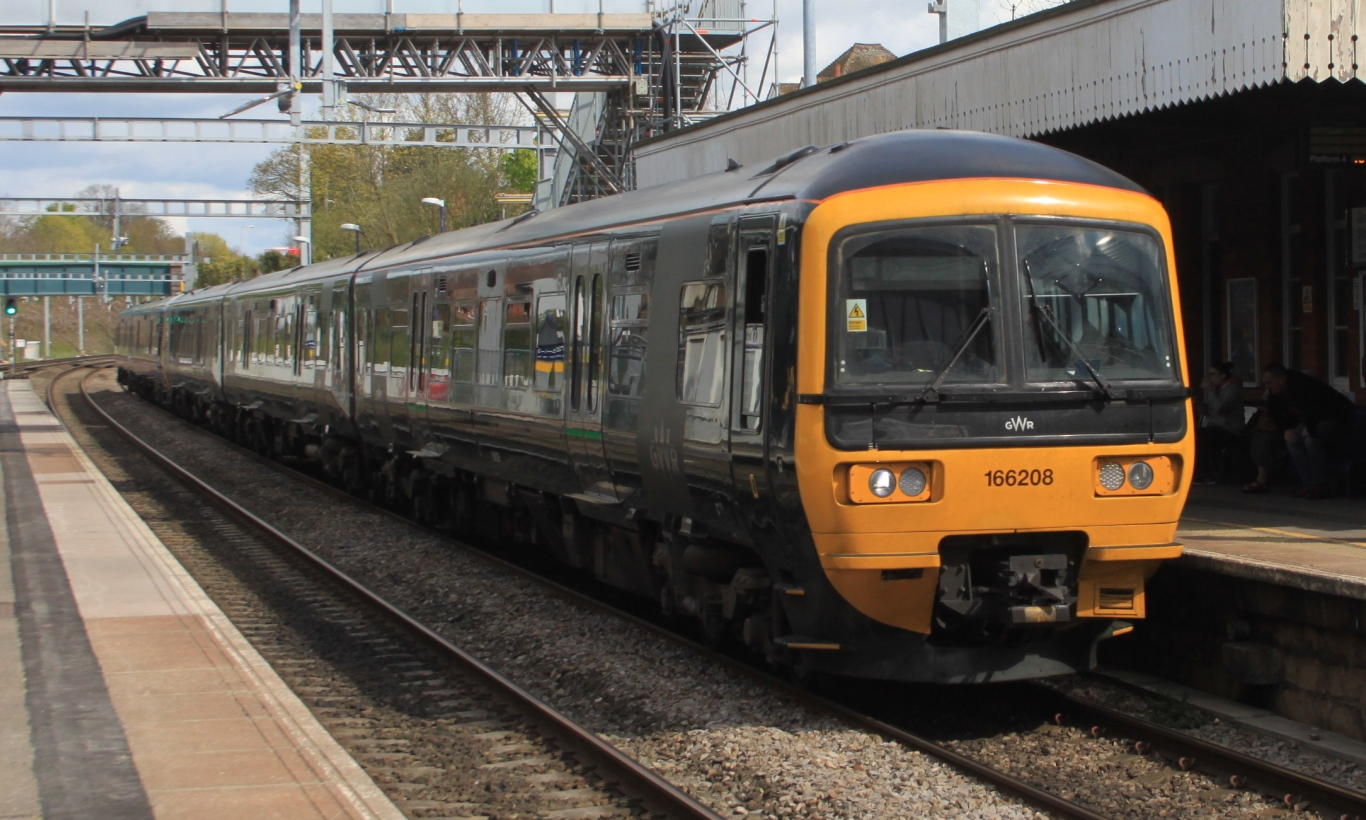
A GWR service to London at platform 4

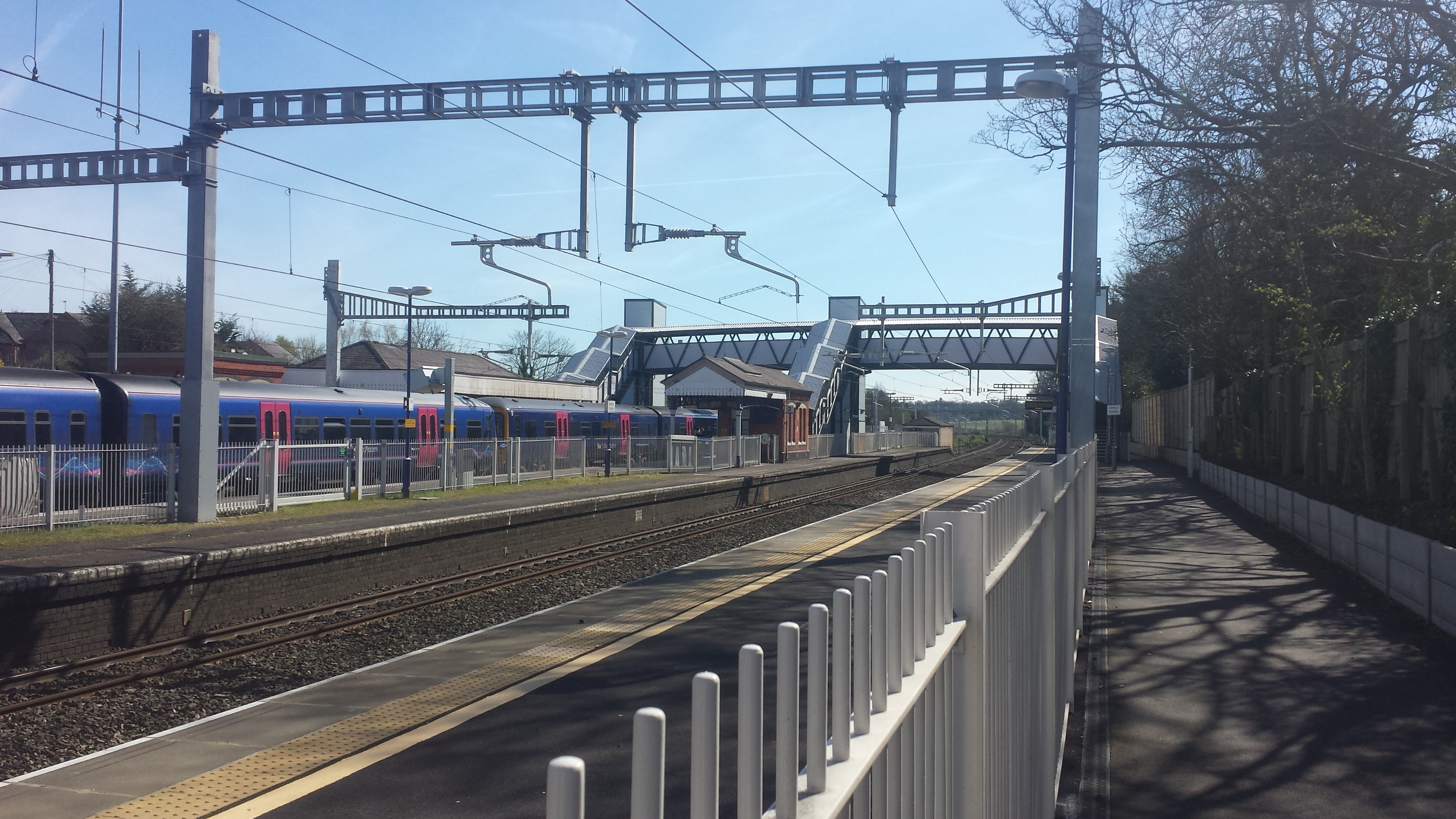
The little-used platform 1, showing fencing off of platforms 1 and 2

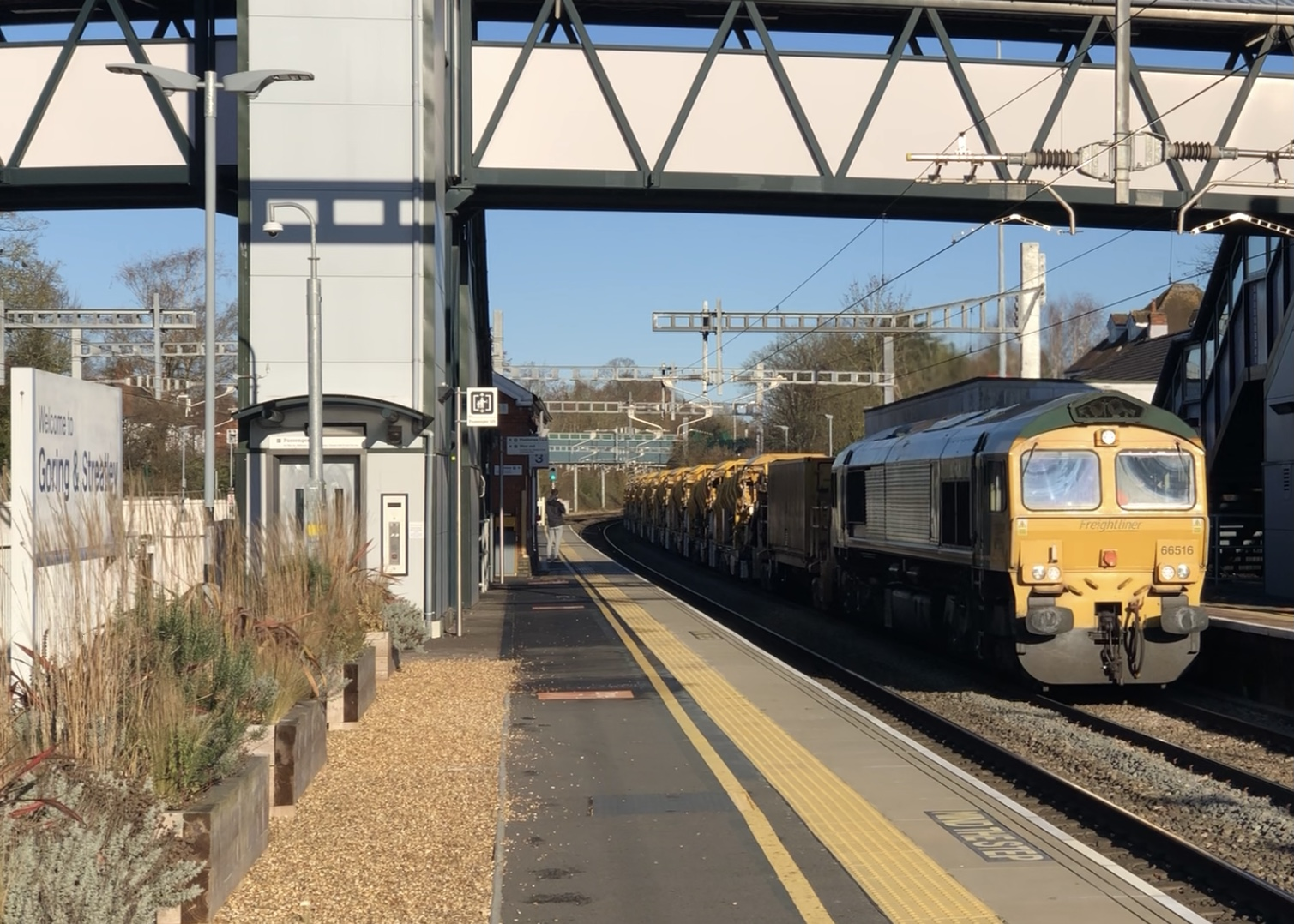
A freight train passes Goring & Streatley, Nov 2021

== Bibliography ==
- Butt, R. V. J. (October 1995). The Directory of Railway Stations: details every public and private passenger station, halt, platform and stopping place, past and present (1st ed.). Sparkford: Patrick Stephens Ltd. ISBN 978-1-85260-508-7. OCLC 60251199. OL 11956311M.
- Jowett, Alan (March 1989). Jowett's Railway Atlas of Great Britain and Ireland: From Pre-Grouping to the Present Day (1st ed.). Sparkford: Patrick Stephens Ltd. ISBN 978-1-85260-086-0. OCLC 22311137.
