= Goring-on-Thames =

Village and civil parish in Oxfordshire, England

Coordinates: 51°31′23″N 1°08′06″W

- Village and civil parish
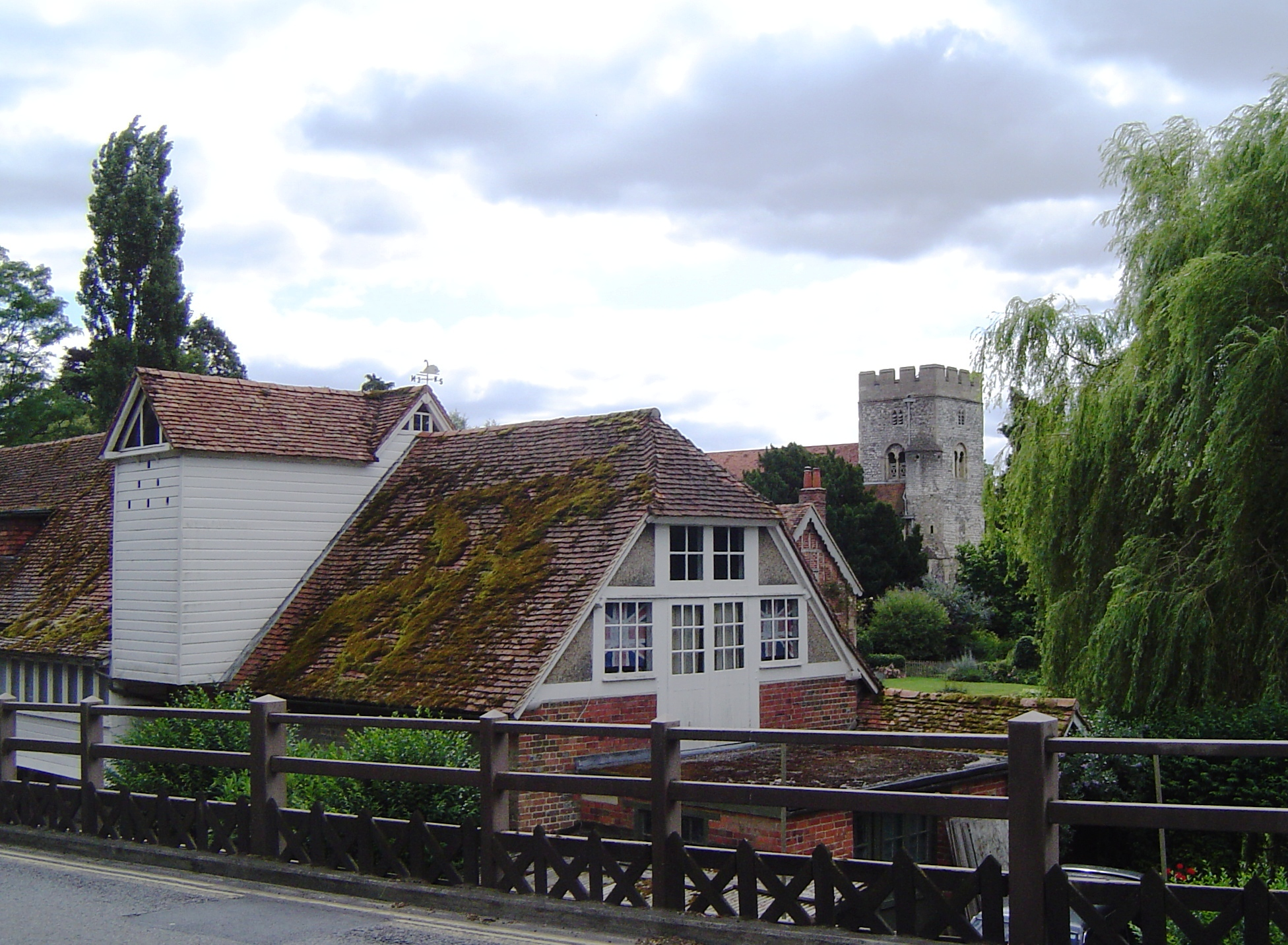
- Goring mill and parish church from the bridge

- Location within Oxfordshire
- Area: 9.61 km^{2} (3.71 sq mi)
- Population: 3,187 (2011 census)
  - Density: 332/km^{2} (860/sq mi)
- OS grid reference: SU6080
- Civil parish: Goring-on-Thames
- District: South Oxfordshire
- Shire county: Oxfordshire
- Region: South East
- Country: England
- Sovereign state: United Kingdom
- Post town: READING
- Postcode district: RG8
- Dialling code: 01491
- Police: Thames Valley
- Fire: Oxfordshire
- Ambulance: South Central
- UK Parliament: Henley and Thame
- Website: Goring Parish Council

Goring-on-Thames (or Goring) is a village and civil parish on the River Thames in South Oxfordshire, England. Situated on the county border with West Berkshire, it is 6 mi (10 km) south of Wallingford and 8 mi (13 km) north-west of Reading. It had a population of 3,187 in the 2011 census and was estimated to have increased to 3,335 by 2019.

Most land is farmland, with woodland on the Goring Gap outcrop of the Chiltern Hills. Its riverside plain encloses the residential area, including a high street with shops, pubs and restaurants. Goring & Streatley railway station lies on the Great Western Main Line, providing trains between London, Reading, and Didcot.

The village church is dedicated to St Thomas Becket with a nave that was built within 50 years of the saint's death, in the early 13th century, along with a later bell tower. Goring faces the smaller Streatley across the Thames; the two are linked by Goring and Streatley Bridge.

== Geography ==
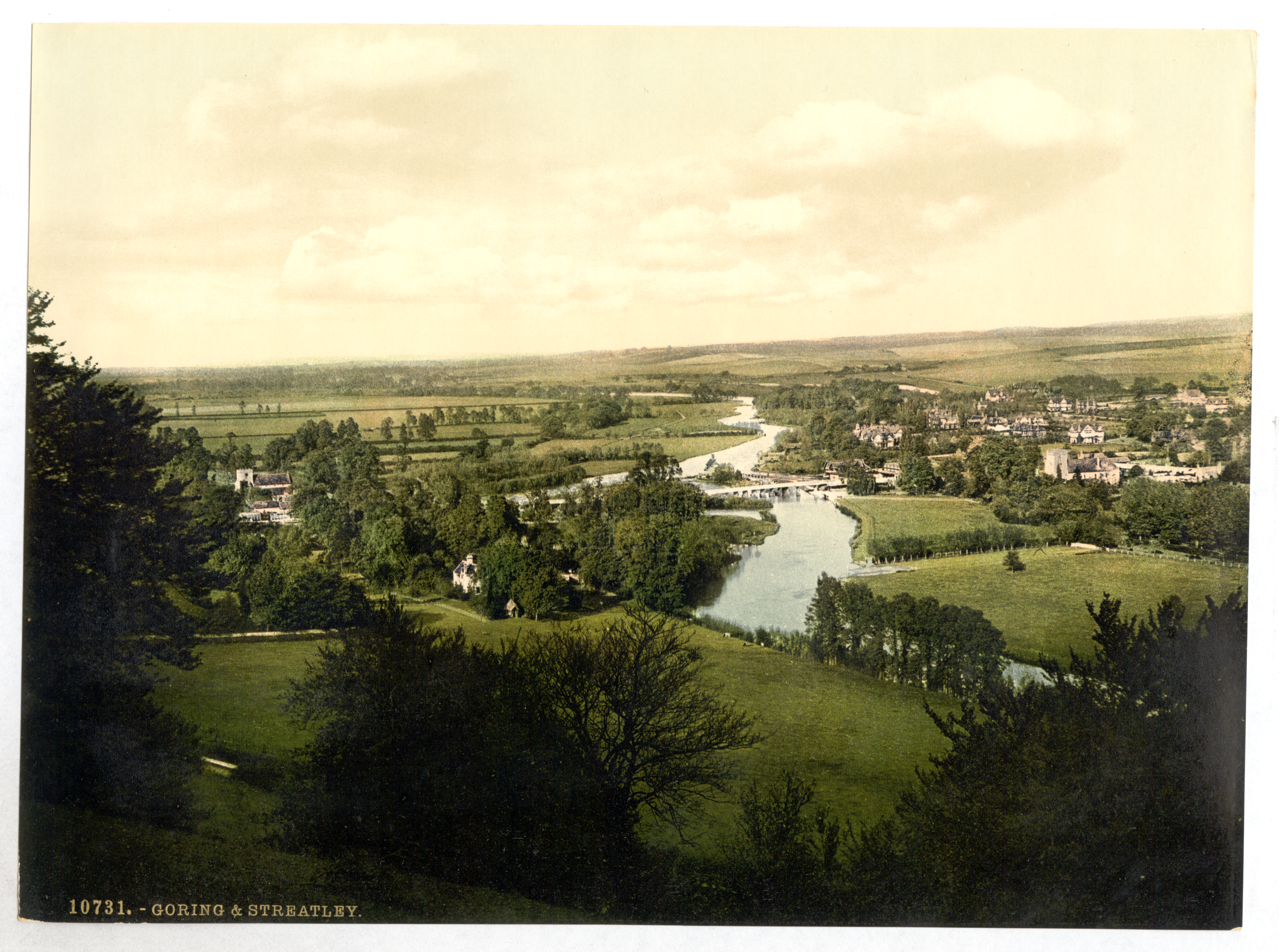
Goring (right), at the end of the nineteenth century

Goring is on the left bank of the River Thames in the Goring Gap between the Berkshire Downs and Chiltern Hills, about 8 mi (13 km) north-west of Reading and 16 mi (26 km) south of Oxford. Across the river is the Berkshire village of Streatley, often seen as a twin village. They are linked by Goring and Streatley Bridge and its adjacent lock and weir. The Thames Path, Icknield Way and the Ridgeway cross the Thames at Goring.

== Transport ==
The Great Western Main Line serves Goring & Streatley railway station; Great Western Railway operates trains between London Paddington, Reading, and Didcot. The service runs every 30 minutes on weekdays and Saturdays, and every hour on Sundays.

GWR provide the service with British Rail Class 387 electric trains, and because work on electrification from Didcot to Oxford has been suspended since 2019, the trains no longer run beyond Didcot Parkway. A separate diesel service runs between Didcot and Oxford.

The local bus service between Goring and Wallingford is run by a Goring-based community interest company, Going Forward Buses, which was established in December 2016. The bus service to Wallingford runs hourly during the working day from Monday to Friday.

== Early history ==
The name Goring first appears in the Domesday Book of 1086 as Garinges, then as Garingies in a charter once held in the British Museum. It translates as "Gara's people".

== Religious sites ==
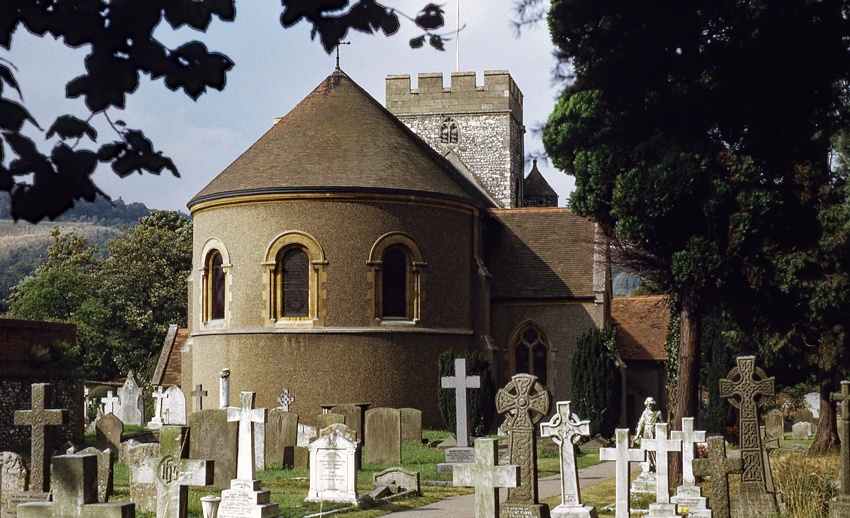
Church of St Thomas of Canterbury

The Church of England parish church of St Thomas of Canterbury displays Norman architecture of the early 12th century, with the bell-stage of a bell tower added in the 15th century. This has a ring of eight bells, one dating from 1290. The wood for the rood screen was taken from HMS Thunderer, one of Nelson's fleet at Trafalgar. A church hall was added in 1901.

The Anglican Churches of Goring, Streatley and South Stoke form a united benefice. A priory of Augustinian nuns was built late in the 12th century with its own priory church adjoining St Thomas's. This survived until demolished with the early 16th-century Dissolution of the Monasteries. The foundations of the priory church, cloister, dormitory, vestry, chapter house and parlour were excavated in 1892.

Goring Free Church belongs to the Countess of Huntingdon's Connexion. The congregation was founded in 1788 and its first chapel built in 1793. At its centenary in 1893, a new church building was added and the original chapel converted into a church hall. It holds two Sunday services.

The Catholic Church of Our Lady and St John the Apostle was designed by the architect William Ravenscroft and built in 1898. It now forms a single parish with the Roman Catholic Church of Christ the King in Woodcote.

== Amenities ==
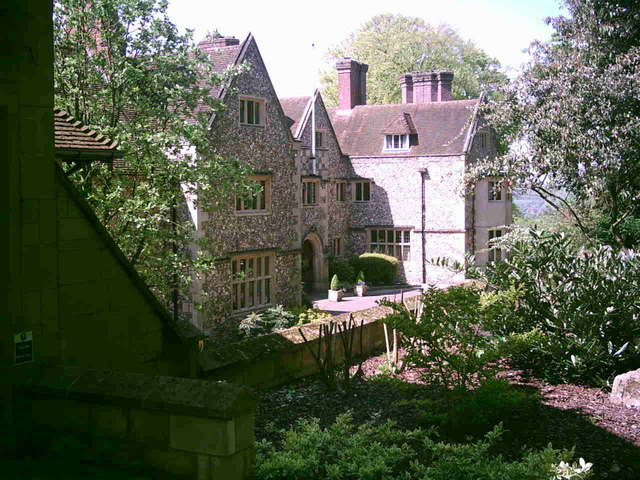
Flint House, on a hill, is a large flint cobblestone house in a Tudor style converted partly to offices. It is used by police forces nationally as a rehabilitation centre.

Goring United Football Club plays in the Reading Football League. Goring-on-Thames Cricket Club, founded in 1876, has two teams in the Berkshire Cricket League. Goring has a lawn tennis club with teams that play in two local leagues. Goring and Streatley Golf Club is located in adjoining Streatley.

Goring-on-Thames' Decorative and Fine Arts Society, founded in 1987, belongs to the National Association of Decorative and Fine Arts Societies. Goring has a Women's Institute.

== Awards ==
=== Oxfordshire Village of the Year 2009 ===
On 10 July 2009, Goring was named Oxfordshire's Village of the Year, ahead of 11 other villages and succeeding Woodcote. The £1000 prize was put towards the village's hydro-electric project to generate electricity from the River Thames. The competition considered the depth of infrastructure and activity in the village and at Goring's £1 million hydro-electric plans.

=== Calor success ===
Goring-on-Thames was the winner in the Sustainability and Communications category and the Overall Regional Winner of the 2011 Calor Village of the Year regional heat for South England.

== Notable residents ==
In the summer of 1893, Oscar Wilde stayed at Ferry House in Goring with Lord Alfred Douglas. While there, Wilde began writing his play An Ideal Husband, which includes a main character named Lord Goring.

An enlarged Ferry Cottage became the retirement home of Sir Arthur Harris, wartime leader of RAF Bomber Command, from 1953 until his death in 1984. He was buried in Burntwood Cemetery in Goring.

In order of birth:

- Sir John Soane (1753–1837), architect, was born in Goring.
- Thomas Rome (1838–1916), Australian politician, died in Goring.
- Digby Willoughby (1845–1901), military mercenary, died in Goring.
- Aubrey Strahan (1852–1928), geologist, retired to Goring.
- Noel Denholm Davis (1876–1950), portrait painter, died in Goring.
- Thomas Miller (1883–1962), first-class cricketer, died in Goring.
- C. H. Dodd (1884–1973), theologian who directed the translation of the New English Bible, died in Goring.
- Henry Harwood (1888–1950), World War II admiral
- Sir Arthur Harris, 1st Baronet (1892–1984), World War II RAF air marshal
- William Allmond Codrington Goode (1907–1986), first Yang di-Pertuan Negara of Singapore, died in Goring.
- Ken Walker (1922–1989), first-class cricketer, died in Goring.
- Anton Rogers (1933–2007), actor
- Sir John Thomson (1941–1994), RAF Air Chief Marshal
- Jon Lord (1941–2012), composer, pianist and rock/classical pioneer, lived in Goring in later life.
- Pete Townshend (born 1945), musician (the Who)
- Pete de Freitas (1961–1989), musician (Echo & the Bunnymen), ashes buried in Goring.
- George Michael (1963–2016), musician, vocalist and producer. Michael lived at Mill Cottage close to the river in his later years. He was found dead there at the age of 53 in the early hours of 25 December 2016.

== Freedom of the parish ==
The privilege of Freedom of the Parish of Goring on Thames has been awarded to:

- Stephanie Bridle, 16 October 2017, for work as a parish councillor
- Janet Hurst: 12 April 2020, for work on the Britain in Bloom competition and Goring Gap Local History Society

== Twin towns ==
- Bellême France since 1979
- Stühlingen Germany

== Sources ==
- Page, William, ed. (1907). Victoria County History: A History of the County of Oxford, Volume 2. pp. 103–104.
- Sherwood, Jennifer; Pevsner, Nikolaus (1974). The Buildings of England: Oxfordshire. Harmondsworth: Penguin Books. pp. 613–616. ISBN 0-14-071045-0.
