= Goring and Streatley Bridge =

Goring and Streatley Bridge)
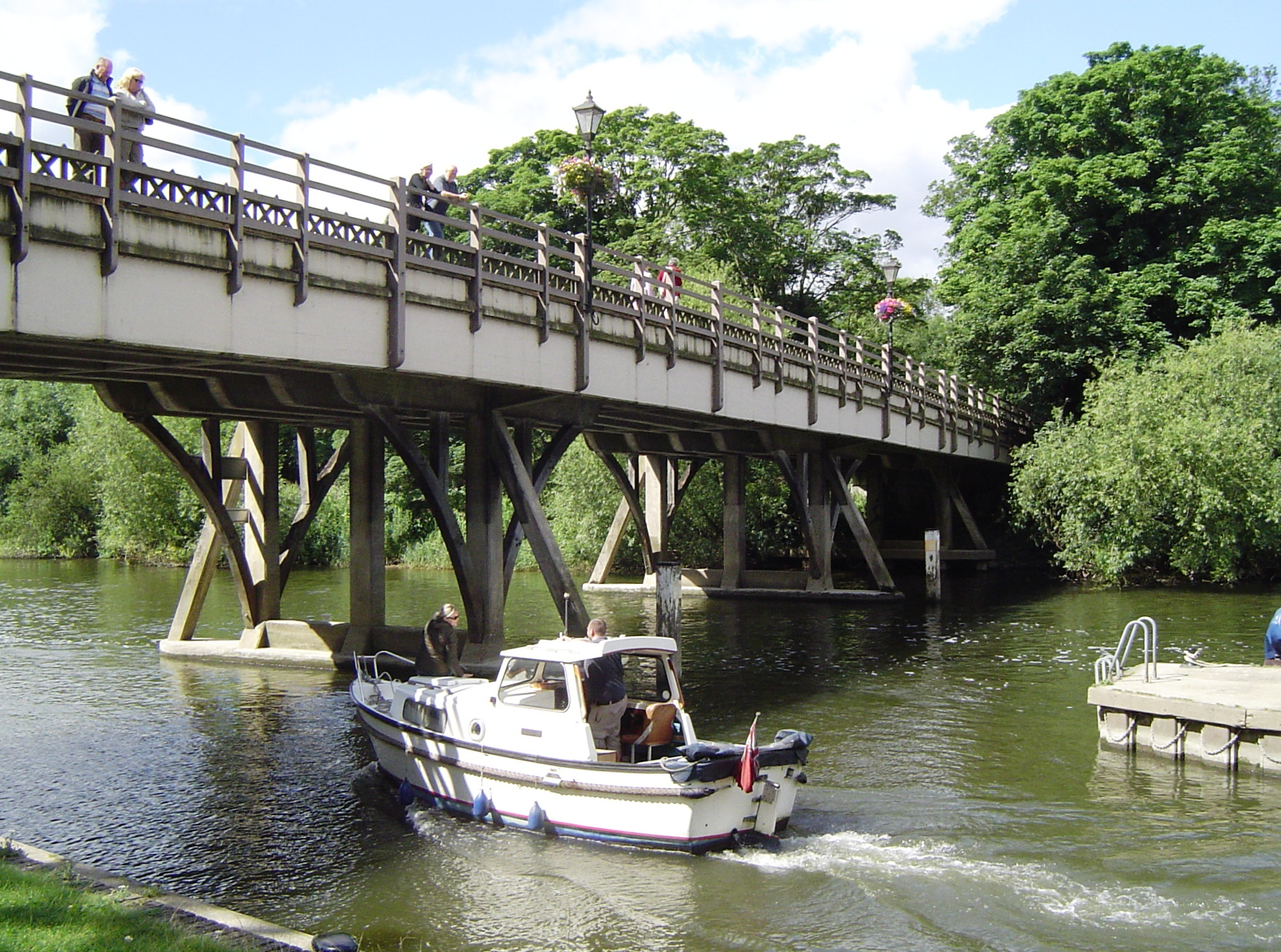
- Goring and Streatley Bridge on the Goring side from Goring Lock
- Coordinates: 51°31′22.5″N 1°08′33″W
- Carries: B4009, Thames Path
- Crosses: River Thames
- Locale: Goring-on-Thames; Streatley

Characteristics
- Material: Timber and metal
- Height: 16 feet 11 inches (5.16 m)

History
- Opened: 1923

Goring and Streatley Bridge is a road bridge across the River Thames in England. The bridge links the twin villages of Goring-on-Thames, Oxfordshire, and Streatley, Berkshire, and is adjacent to Goring Lock.

The present bridge was built in 1923, and is in two parts: The western bridge is from Streatley to an island in the river (overlooking The Swan hotel, once owned by Danny La Rue); The eastern bridge is from the island to Goring and overlooks Goring Lock. The bridge consists of timber struts supporting a metal roadway.

Both the Thames Path and The Ridgeway cross the Thames on this bridge.

A bridge was first built here in 1837 being a flat timber bridge of beams on posts. Prior to this there was a ferry although occasionally people would ride across, even driving in a one-horse chaise. In 1674 the ferry turned over in the weir pool with the loss of sixty lives. In the 1970s a Citroën Dyane crashed through the railings at the Streatley end of the bridge landing on a concrete weir 16 feet below. The local Citroën dealer used the photo to illustrate the inherent strength of their upmarket 2CV.

== See also ==
- Crossings of the River Thames

| Next bridge upstream | River Thames | Next bridge downstream |
| Moulsford Railway Bridge (railway) | Goring and Streatley Bridge; Grid reference SU595807 | Gatehampton Railway Bridge (railway) |
| Next bridge upstream | Thames Path | Next bridge downstream |
| southern bank Benson Lock | Goring and Streatley Bridge | northern bank Whitchurch Bridge |
