= Moulsford railway station =

Former railway station in England

Coordinates: 51.562°N 1.1467°W

Moulsford
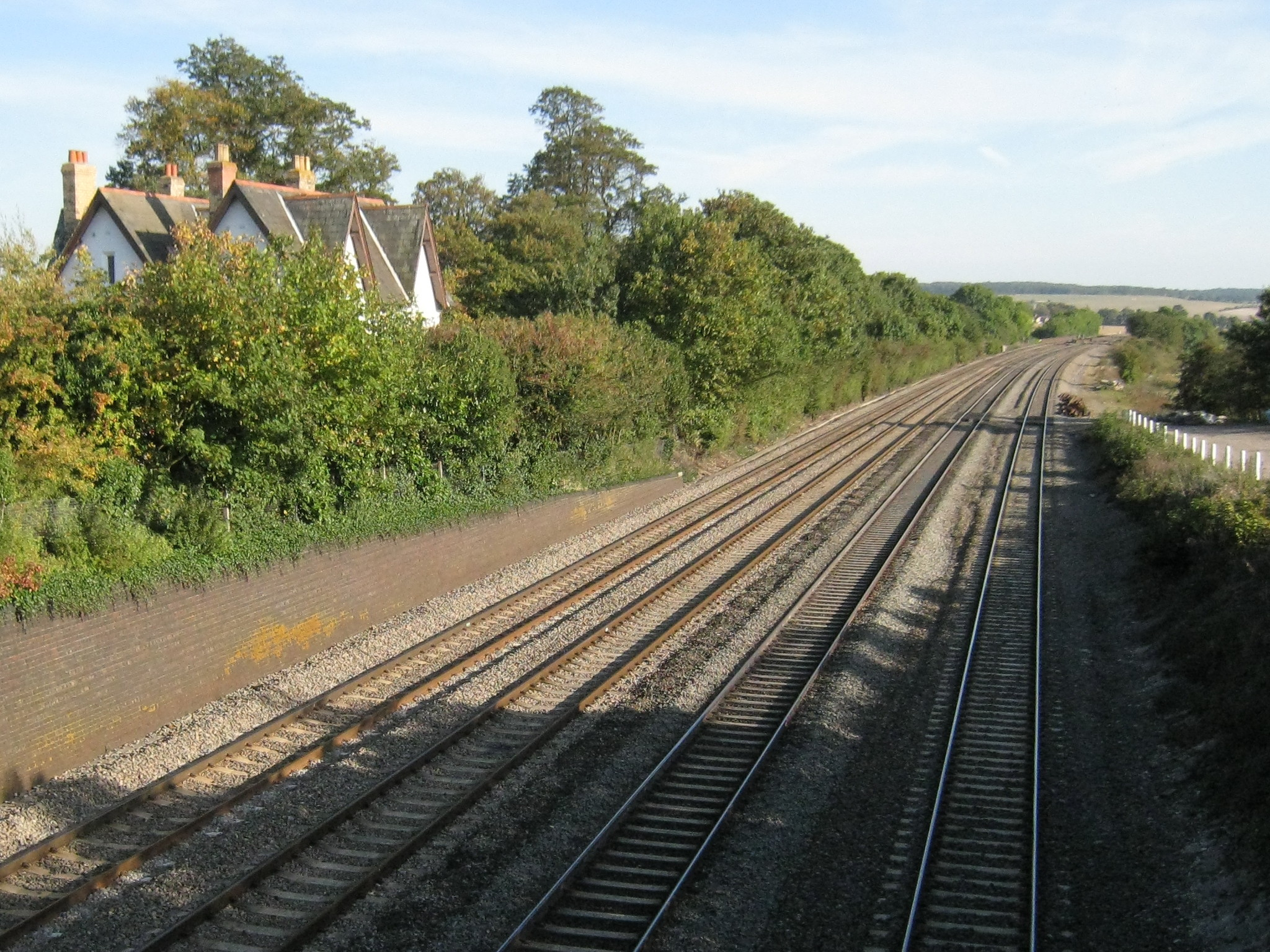
- Site of Moulsford railway station in September 2009. Viewed from A329 bridge looking south-east towards Goring; parapet of Moulsford Railway Bridge is visible on the curve

General information
- Location: Moulsford, South Oxfordshire; England
- Grid reference: SU592851
- Platforms: 3

Other information
- Status: Disused

History
- Original company: Great Western Railway
- Pre-grouping: GWR

Key dates
- 1 June 1840: Line opened Station opened as Wallingford Road
- 2 July 1866: Renamed Moulsford
- 29 February 1892: Station closed
Location

Moulsford railway station was on the original route of the Great Western Railway, being one of three intermediate stations provided when the line was extended from Reading to Steventon in 1840.

== History ==
The Great Western Railway was built and opened in stages. It had opened as far as Reading on 30 March 1840; on 1 June 1840 it was opened to Steventon, with three intermediate stations, the northernmost of which was Wallingford Road; it was possibly named Moulsford originally, being renamed by December 1840.

Wallingford Road station was located on the eastern side of the Reading–Wallingford main road (the present-day A329 road), about a mile to the north of Moulsford village, and slightly further from the village of Cholsey, which lies to the north. Being on the western side of the River Thames it was then in Berkshire; the boundaries were redrawn in 1974 placing the station site two miles (3.2 km) inside present-day Oxfordshire.

On 2 July 1866, a branch line to Wallingford was opened by the Wallingford & Watlington Railway, and on the same day Wallingford Road station was renamed Moulsford. Whilst the junction for the branch was at Moulsford station, the branch line track ran parallel to the main line for three-quarters of a mile (1.2 km) before curving away. The Wallingford & Watlington Railway never reached the second-named town, and it was absorbed by the GWR in 1872.

In 1892, during quadrupling of the main line, the junction for Wallingford was resited down the line to the north-west, closer to the point of divergence, and a new station built there. Moulsford station closed on 29 February 1892, being replaced the same day by the new station which was known as Cholsey and Moulsford, being significantly closer to Cholsey than to Moulsford. Some of the original station buildings can still be seen at the site of Moulsford railway station.

To the south-east of the former station site is Moulsford Railway Bridge, a stone-faced brick bridge which crosses the River Thames, having four 62-foot (19 m) skew arches.

== Services ==
Preceding station	Disused railways	Following station
Didcot; Line and station open	Great Western Railway; Great Western Main Line	Goring & Streatley; Line and station open
Wallingford; Line and station closed	Great Western Railway; Wallingford railway branch line	Terminus
