= Wallingford railway branch line =

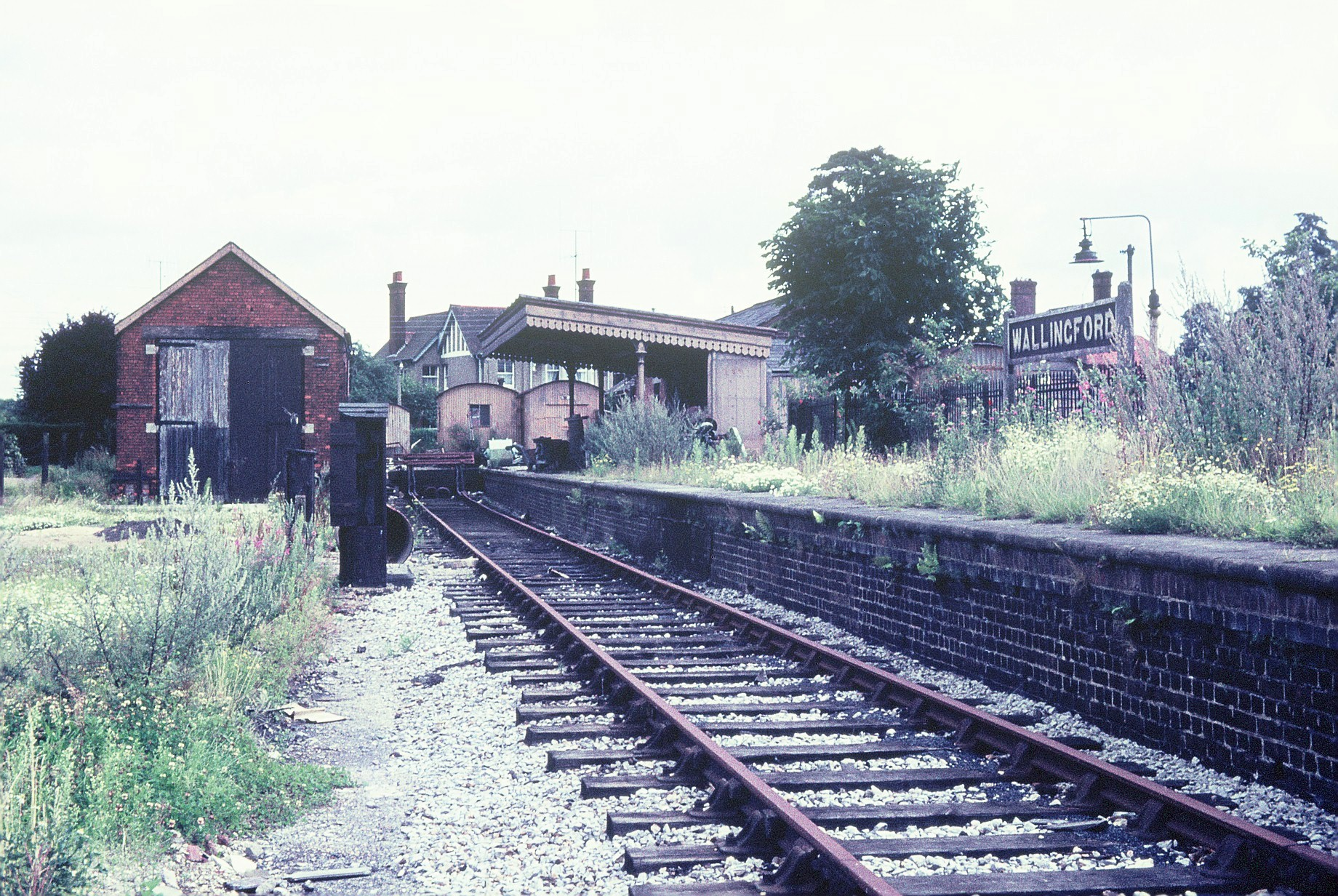
- Wallingford railway station in the 1960s.

Overview
- Owner: Great Western Railway; British Rail
- Locale: Oxfordshire
- Termini: Wallingford Road; Wallingford railway station

History
- Opened: 1866
- Closed: 1981

Technical
- Line length: 2.5 mi (4.0 km)
- Number of tracks: 1
- Track gauge: 1,435 mm (4 ft 8 1/2 in) standard gauge

The Wallingford railway branch line was a 2.5 mi (4.0 km) branch line between the market town of Wallingford and the Great Western Railway main line at Wallingford Road in Oxfordshire. The railway, which opened in 1866, was originally planned to go a further 6 mi (9.7 km) to Watlington but this was never completed because of insufficient funds. Instead Watlington was reached by a 9 mi (14 km) line completed by the Watlington and Princes Risborough Railway Company in 1872. After the Wallingford branch line opened, it ran regular passenger shuttle services to the GWR mainline for almost a century. It closed to passengers in 1959; the line escaped the Beeching Axe, remaining open for goods services until 1981.

In 1985, the line was acquired by the Cholsey and Wallingford Railway; in 1997 the heritage railway began operating a selection of vintage train services on part of the line near Wallingford.

== Background ==
The Great Western Railway opened its first broad gauge main line in stages. When Reading to Steventon was opened on 1 June 1840, there was a station called Wallingford Road, located immediately to the east of the road that now forms the A329. The station was about three miles from Wallingford itself.

The prosperity of towns served by railways increased considerably, as manufactures could be transported to market much more cheaply, and communities not directly served by a railway were at a disadvantage accordingly. Watlington, with a population in 1851 of 1,884, suffered in the early part of the nineteenth century from poor road communications, at a time when transport and trade were becoming important, and other settlements were flourishing.

== Planning and construction ==
In 1861 a branch railway was proposed from near Cholsey, to run through Wallingford, Benson, Watlington and Chinnor to reach Princes Risborough, but the idea was not progressed. In 1863 a more modest scheme, to build only as far as Wallingford, went to Parliament but the promoters withdrew the bill.

Wallingford and Watlington Railway Act 1864
- Act of Parliament
- Parliament of the United Kingdom
- Long title: An Act for making a Railway from the Great Western Railway to Watlington in the County of Oxford.
- Citation: 27 & 28 Vict. c. cclxvi

Dates
- Royal assent: 25 July 1864

Text of statute as originally enacted

The scheme was revived late in 1863, now proposing a line from Cholsey to Wallingford and Watlington, with enthusiastic support from the latter town. Public meetings in January 1864 expressed a desire to proceed, and a bill went to the 1864 session of Parliament. The line was authorised by an act of Parliament, the Wallingford and Watlington Railway Act 1864 (27 & 28 Vict. c. cclxvi), of 25 July 1864, with capital of £80,000: it was to be called the Wallingford and Watlington Railway.

While the Wallingford and Watlington Railway Act 1864 authorised the capital of £80,000, the company needed to get commitment from investors to subscribe that money, and the process did not prove easy; however by the Spring of 1865 sufficient funds were available to let a contract for the construction as far as Wallingford. The line was to make a junction with the GWR main line at Wallingford Road station, and run north-westward alongside the GWR for three-quarters of a mile before turning north-eastward run independently to Wallingford. The track gauge was authorised by the act to be either broad or narrow (later known as "standard gauge"), but the Great Western Railway main line at Cholsey had just been converted from broad gauge to mixed gauge, so the decision was taken to build the Wallingford and Watlington line to the narrow gauge. It was to be the first branch off the GWR's main line to be made on the narrow gauge. First proposals were to construct Wallingford station adjacent to the market place, but in fact it was located on the southern margin of the town.

In the Autumn of 1865 a local newspaper reported on progress:

Wallingford and Watlington Railway: This railway, which runs through the parish of Cholsey and forms a junction with the main line of the G.W.R., is progressing rapidly toward completion. The cutting in Cholsey field and near the Wallingford-road station, which is 60 feet deep and nearly perpendicular, will shortly be completed. The permanent rails are laid for a considerable distance near Wallingford. The Cholsey station (it is said) will be near the church, which will be a most convenient spot, not only for the inhabitants of Cholsey, but for Aston, Blewbury and the adjoining villages to the west. The starting point will be at the Wallingford-road station.

— Reading Mercury

If Cholsey station had been built, it would have been on the road to South Moreton, near St Mary's church. The name was reusued by GWR for Cholsey station, which was later built for services using the GWR main line. The Wallingford Road station on the main line was renamed Moulsford on the day the Wallingford branch opened.

== Opening ==
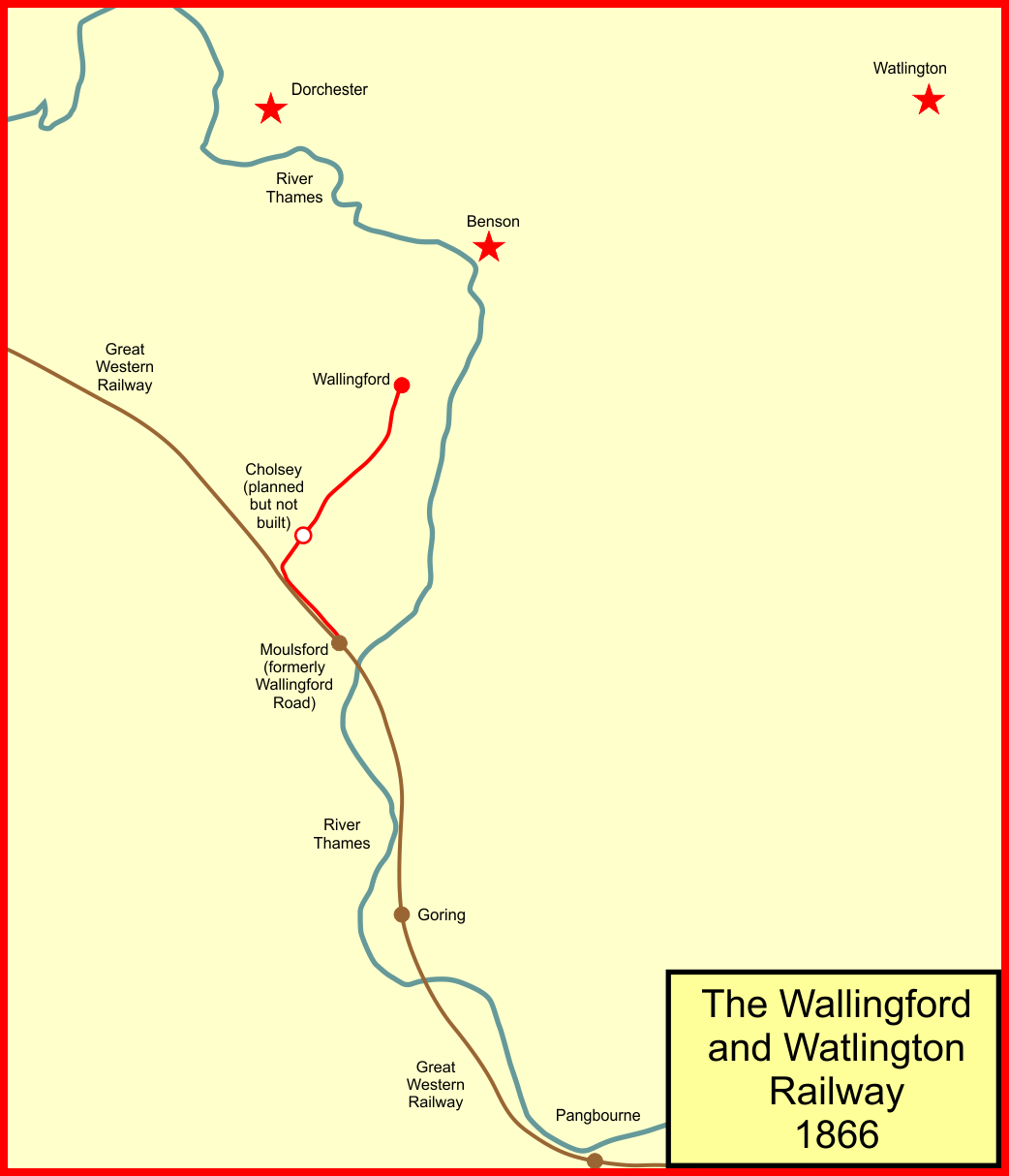
The Wallingford branch line, 1866

The Board of Trade inspection took place on Tuesday 26 June 1866, (Note: Karau says Thursday, 26 June, but this is a calendar error, one of three appearing on p 7, col 2) and line opened to the public without ceremony on Monday 2 July 1866. (Note: Karau says Monday, 7 July 1866, as does Jenkins in Oxfordshire Railways Through Time, but this includes a calendar error and is contradicted by contemporary press reports in Jacksons Oxford Journal, London Evening Standard and Oxford Times, all referenced below.)

There were nine passenger trains each way daily, and the branch was worked by the Great Western Railway under an agreement of 30 June 1866.

Newspapers recorded the opening:

Opening of the Wallingford Railway: The branch railway from Wallingford Road station to the town of Wallingford having been completed and inspected on behalf of the Board of Trade, was opened for passenger and goods traffic yesterday. The line, which is three miles and a half long, has been constructed at the cost of a local company, and will be worked by the Great Western Railway Company. Mr Besant, the divisional superintendent, took the direction of the arrangements, which were in every respect satisfactory, but the opening was not celebrated by any kind of demonstration.

— London Evening Standard

Wallingford Railway: This Railway, which is called the Wallingford and Watlington Railway, was opened on Monday last to Wallingford. This line forms a junction at the Wallingford Road station, Great Western Railway, and runs parallel with that line for a distance of about three quarters of a mile; it then quits company, diverges to the right, and then runs about three miles through this parish, and two and a half miles in the property of Charles Morrison Esq., of Basildon House. The line appears to work well.

— Oxford Times

Following the opening the board met to consider the issue of extending the line to Benson (at the time frequently referred to as Bensington) as the statutory powers for land acquisition were to expire soon. The general economic conditions had deteriorated considerably, and the commercial bank Overend, Gurney and Company had failed in May 1866, deepening the crisis. Money became unobtainable and the question of extending the line was deferred: it was obvious that further subscriptions would not be forthcoming for some time. In fact only £17,575 of the £80,000 capital for the line had ever been paid up. The company's own revenue account was in serious difficulty, and sums due to the GWR in connection with the working arrangement were not being paid, and the contractor for the part of the line already built was also pressing for his money.

On 15 December 1868 the company's solicitor informed the directors that a bill was to be presented to Parliament to authorise a railway from Princes Risborough to Watlington; this became the Watlington and Princes Risborough Railway and its promotion marked the end of the Wallingford and Watlington Company's aspirations to reach Watlington.

== Great Western Railway ==
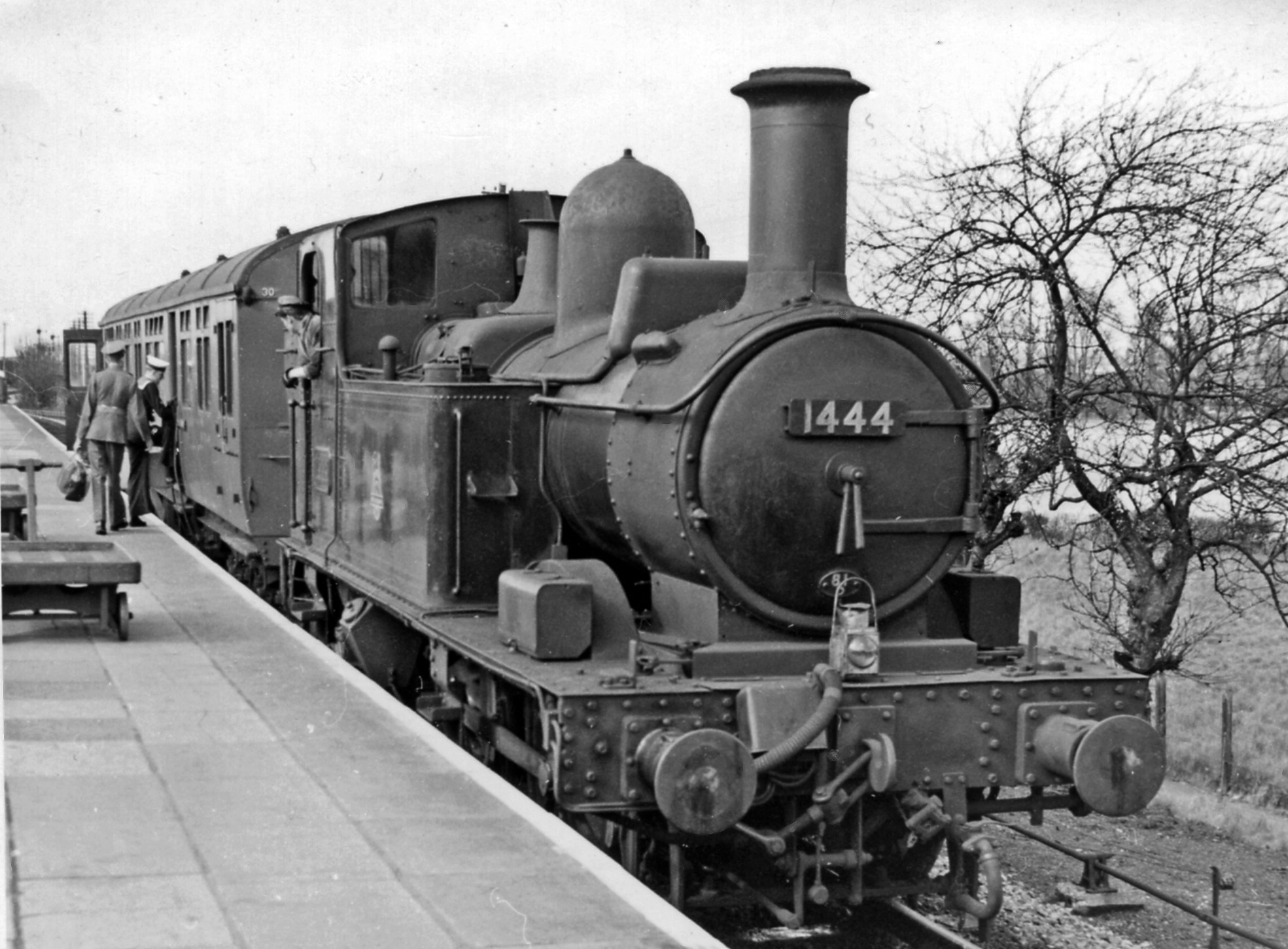
A Wallingford branch train at Cholsey & Moulsford station

On 10 August 1870 the Wallingford board met with the GWR directors to attempt to sell their line to the larger company, but the GWR blandly declined for the time being.

Wallingford and Watlington Railway (Abandonment, &c.) Act 1872
- Act of Parliament
- Parliament of the United Kingdom
- Long title: An Act to enable the Wallingford and Watlington Railway Company to abandon parts of their authorised Railways, and to sell and transfer their Undertaking to the Great Western Railway Company; and for other purposes.
- Citation: 35 & 36 Vict. c. cxliv

Dates
- Royal assent: 25 July 1872

In June 1871 the matter was raised again and an offer to purchase was made: £3,515 of GWR 5% preference stock would be transferred to the W&WR shareholders, as well as £16,750 cash. The transfer was made and on 2 December 1871 the line was taken over by the GWR. The act of Parliament ratifying the transfer, the Wallingford and Watlington Railway (Abandonment, &c.) Act 1872 (35 & 36 Vict. c. cxliv) was subsequently made on 18 July 1872.

After the GWR main line was widened to four tracks in 1892, the opportunity was taken to relocate the junction station: Wallingford Road station was closed and a new junction station called Cholsey & Moulsford was opened 55 chains (0.69 miles) north west on 29 February 1892.

Following the Railways Act 1921, by 1925 the six-road goods yard dealt with an average of 45 wagons daily. The passenger station had a single four-coach platform with no run-round; that operation was performed by propelling to the area of the goods yard. There were 18 passenger trains each way daily in 1938.

== British Rail ==
With the passing of the Transport Act 1947 and the creation of British Rail, passenger services were 14 trains each way on weekdays running only to and from Cholsey station in 1947. It was operated by an 0-4-2 tank locomotive and a single push-and-pull coach. The passenger trains was known locally as "the bunk" but the 1947 writer stated that the origin of the term was unknown.

== Final years and closure ==
Wallingford station closed to passenger trains on 15 June 1959, although there was some use later in connection with carnivals in 1967 and 1968. Although goods operations to Wallingford station ceased on 13 September 1965, rail traffic continued to run to the Associated British Maltsters (Southern) Ltd mill. The line remained opened until that ceased in on 1 June 1981.

After the closure of the line, the former station site at Wallingford was redeveloped as Charter Way housing estate.

== Heritage railway ==
The branch line has been restored to operation by the Cholsey and Wallingford Railway Preservation Society. Heritage trains operate at selected weekends.
