= BunkFest =

UK music festival

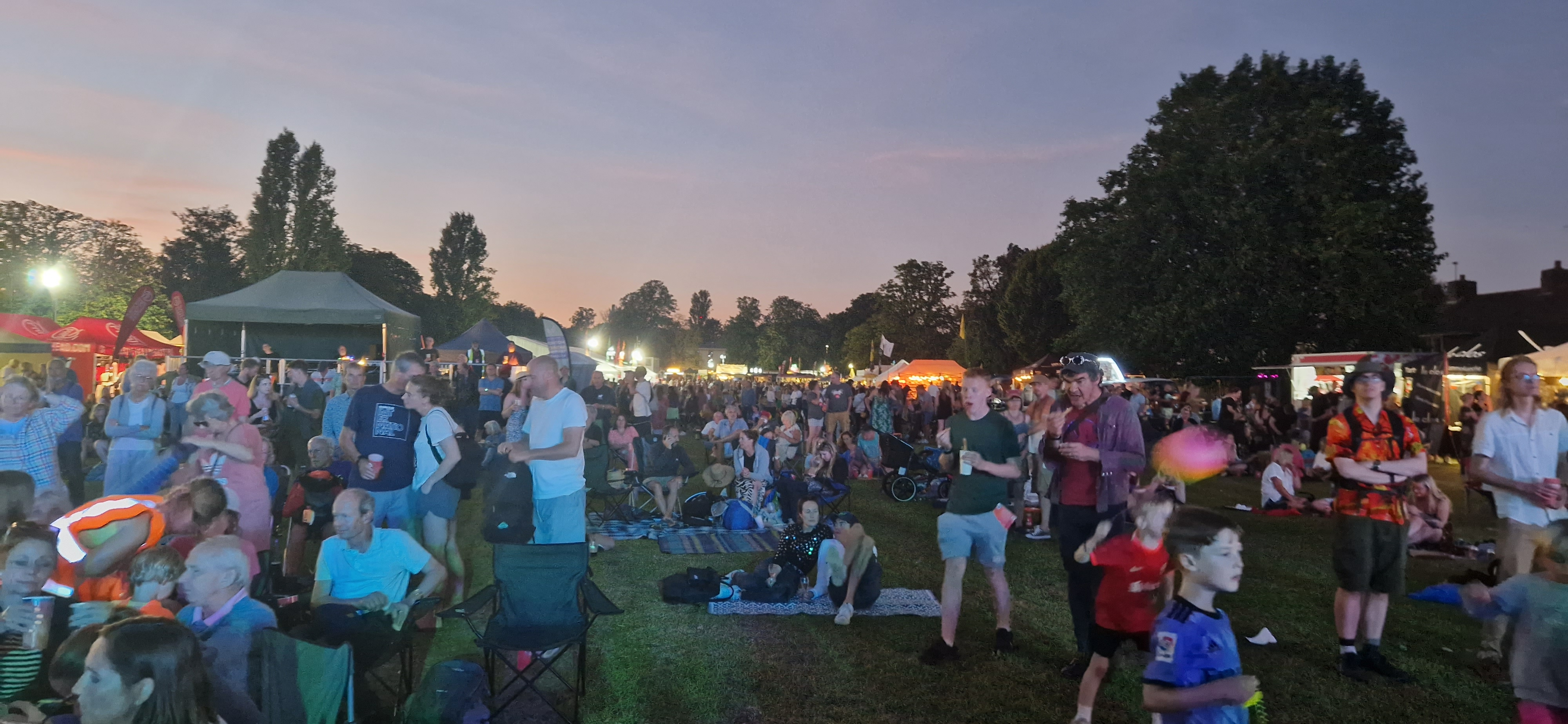
- BunkFest in the Kinecroft in 2023
- Status: Active
- Dates: Weekend after August bank holiday
- Frequency: Annually
- Locations: Wallingford, Oxfordshire, England
- Coordinates: 51.59925°N 1.12854°W
- Years active: 2002–present (except 2020)
- Website: www.bunkfest.co.uk

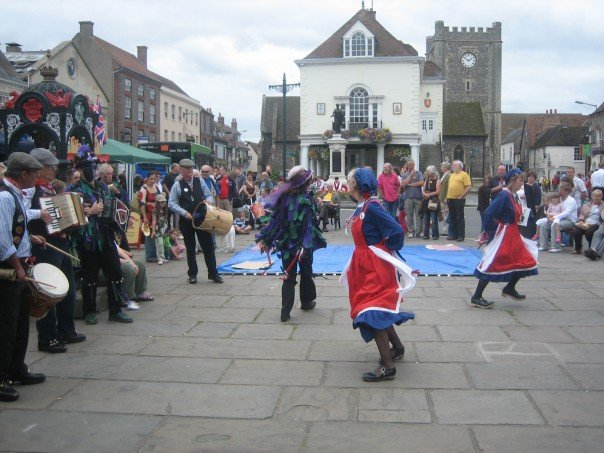
Dancing in the Market Square, Wallingford, at BunkFest 2007

BunkFest is an end-of–summer music festival that takes place in the town of Wallingford in the English county of Oxfordshire. It features a broad range of music, dance displays, a beer festival, food from all over the world, trains and boats. BunkFest is a not-for-profit free access festival and is run entirely (apart from some technical services) by volunteers.

BunkFest was started in 2002 by a small group of local folk music enthusiasts. With the exception of 2020, when it was cancelled due to the COVID-19 pandemic, it has run every year since. It runs for three days (Friday to Sunday) over the first weekend after the August bank holiday, which is usually the first weekend in September.

In evidence given to a Parliamentary inquiry in 2021, the organisers estimated that the festival had a peak attendance of 10,000 people, with 7,500 on the main festival field and 2,500 people in the town centre. In 2022, they estimated a total attendance over the weekend of 30,000. At that time, in addition to the main festival field, there were 15 fringe venues in the town, such as pubs and restaurants, that provided music and entertainment.

== History ==
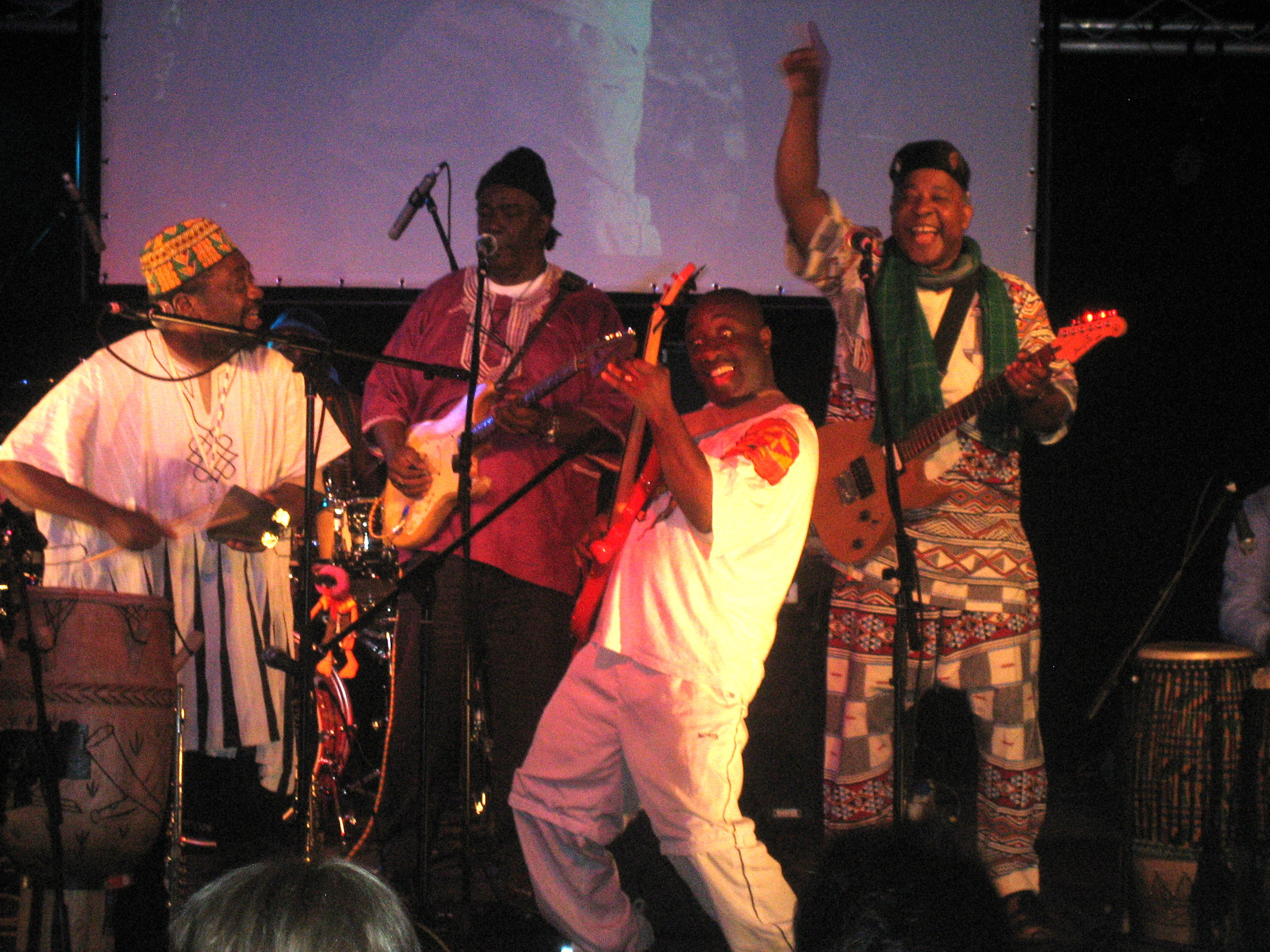
Osibisa performing at BunkFest 2008

BunkFest was started in 2002 by a small group of local folk music enthusiasts. These included Bob Wyatt, then the landlord of the Cross Keys public house in Wallingford, and Colin Dolton. Bob Wyatt died in 2019, but Colin Dolton is still a director of the festival company. Members of the Cholsey and Wallingford heritage railway line were also involved, which gave the festival its name, the Wallingford Bunk being the local nickname for that line.

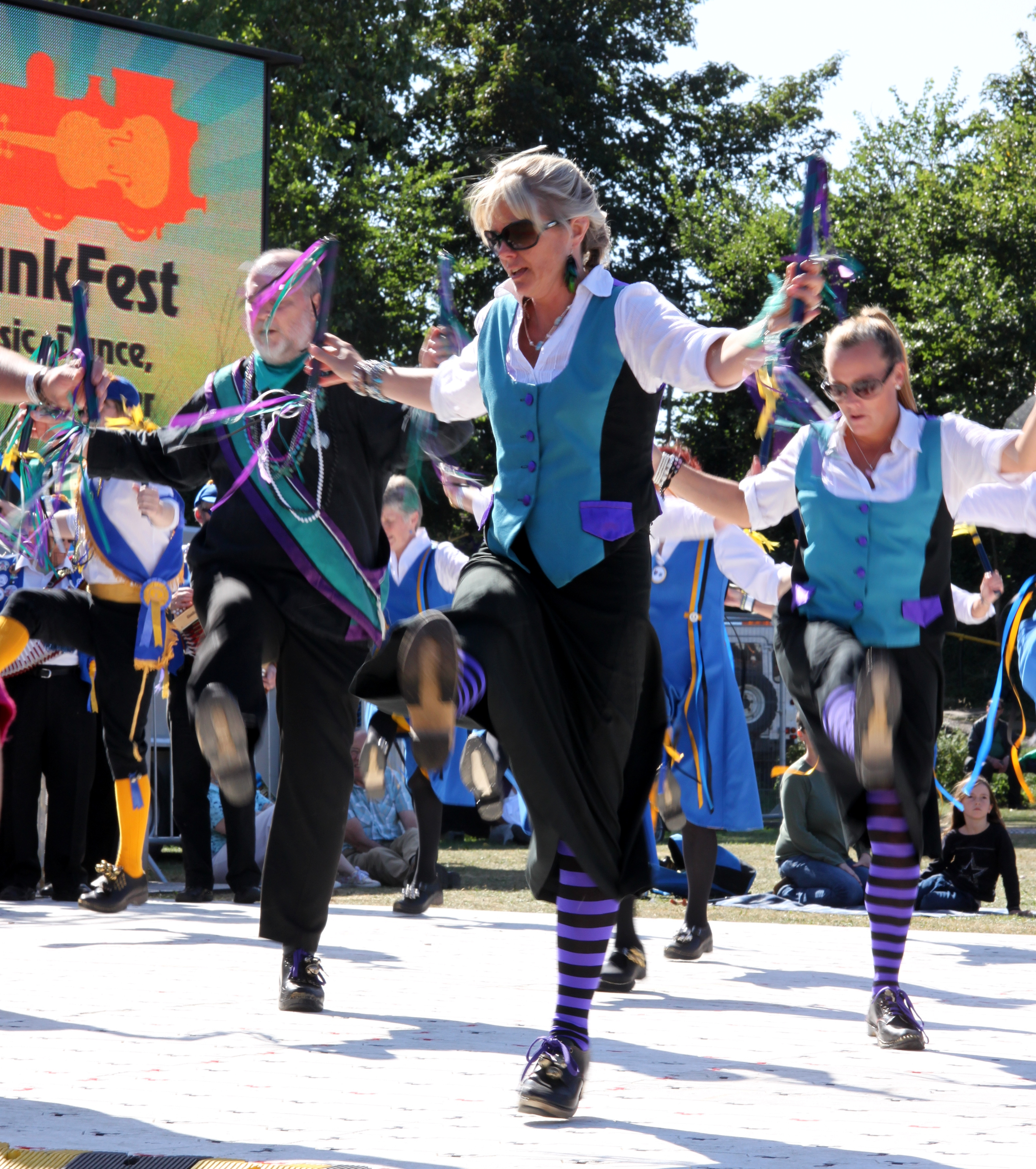
Morris Dancers at BunkFest 2013

The 2002 festival was held in the grounds of the Cross Keys, but it was so popular it spilled over into the Kinecroft field across the road. Over the years the festival grew to encompass the whole of the Kinecroft and the town's Market Place and Sports Park. It has also grown to include many festival fringe venues throughout the town including, appropriately, the Cross Keys. Over the same period the festival has evolved to be less folk music oriented and more community oriented, whilst including different kinds of music from around the world.

The COVID-19 pandemic struck a severe blow to the festival, with the 2020 festival cancelled and the 2021 festival curtailed. As a free festival staffed by a mixture of volunteers and freelancers, BunkFest was unable to benefit from government initiatives such as the cut in VAT or the Culture Recovery Fund. Several suppliers were forced into liquidation and crew were forced to find jobs elsewhere. However, in 2022 the festival came back in strength, celebrating its 20th anniversary and its transition from a pub car park to the grand festival it is today.

The growth in numbers of attendees by 2024 led to changes to accommodate the numbers, with the festival expanding to use the Bull Croft field in addition to the Kinecroft. As the Bullcroft is located on the opposite side of the High Street to the Kinecroft, this necessitated the closure of that road to provide a safe pedestrian route between the two. In previous years the town's Market Place was closed to traffic, but as the High Street is the only alternative route through the town, Market Place remained open in 2024, with many of the stalls and spaces from there moved to the two fields.

== Event ==
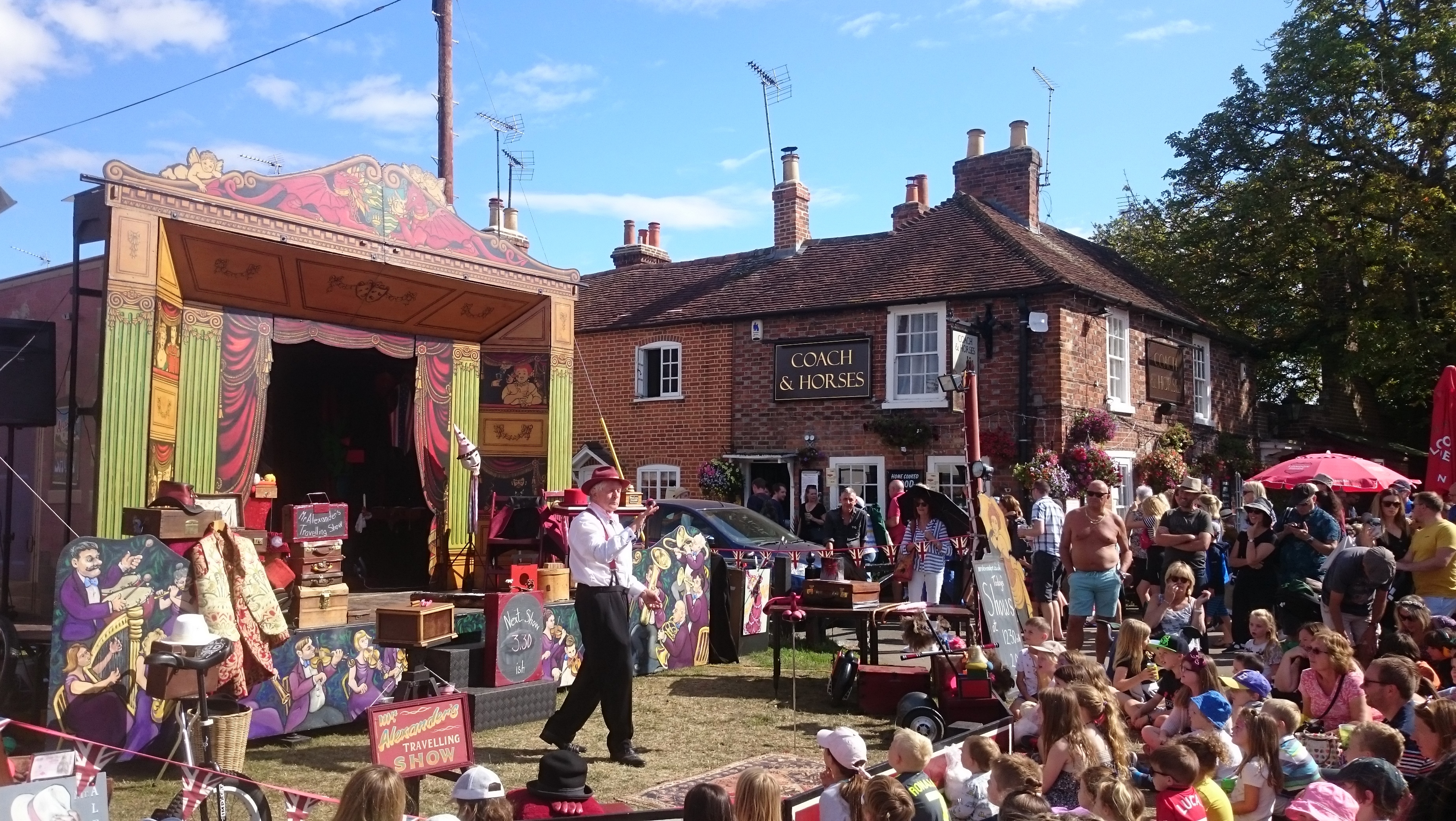
A magician performing on the Kinecroft near the Coach and Horses pub in 2019

Bunkfest runs for three days (Friday to Sunday) over the first weekend after the August Bank Holiday, which is usually the first weekend in September. As of 2024, it has two principal venues at the Kinecroft and Bull Croft fields in the centre of Wallingford, with other fringe venues spread throughout the town centre, principally in pubs, clubs, restaurants and cafes.

The festival is intended to appeal to a wide audience and should be thought of as a music festival with broad family appeal. The main stage, in the Kinecroft, features light music and dancing during the day and lively folk, folk-rock and world music acts in the evening. Other venues round the town feature a wide variety of acts ranging from quiet, contemplative folk artists and singer-songwriters to raucous rock bands.

The Cholsey and Wallingford heritage railway line brings people from the main rail network at Cholsey station and includes performances on the train. The festival also includes boat trips on the River Thames operated by Salters Steamers, with live music being played on each boat.

There is an abundance of stage and music sights during the festival. There is a main stage line up in which in the 2022 festival featured many artists such as Geno Washington & The RamJam Band, The Blues Band, Rusty Snake, and many more artists throughout the three day festival. The festival attracts between thirty and fifty dance sides. The dance programme varies from year to year, and has included, Cotswold and Border Morris, Appalachian and Eastern European forms, as well as traditional Irish, Scottish and Welsh forms. Additionally, there are Fringe performances in which the music of BunkFest spreads beyond the main stage and into venues around its host town.

BunkFest offers an exclusive "friend of BunkFest" evening for its adult participants. The "Friend of BunkFest" evening consists of a night of live music, complimentary food and adult beverages.

== Performers ==
Headline performers have included Bellowhead, Eliza Carthy, Cara Dillon, Oysterband and Chumbawamba.
