= Appleford-on-Thames =

Village in Oxfordshire, England

Coordinates: 51.639°N 1.240°W

Appleford
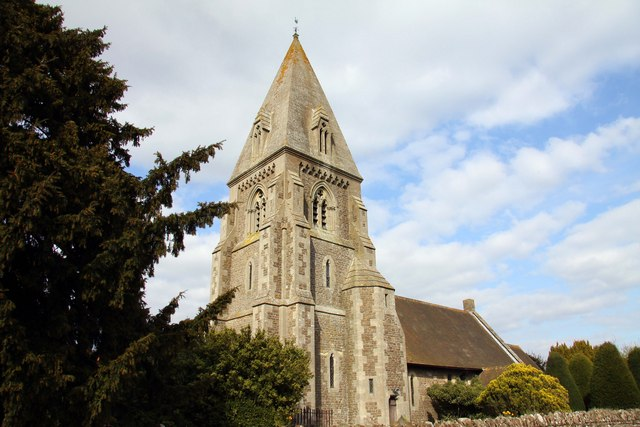
- SS Peter & Paul parish church

- Location within Oxfordshire
- Area: 2.97 km^{2} (1.15 sq mi)
- Population: 350 (2011 Census)
  - Density: 118/km^{2} (310/sq mi)
- OS grid reference: SU5293
- Civil parish: Appleford-on-Thames
- District: Vale of White Horse
- Shire county: Oxfordshire
- Region: South East
- Country: England
- Sovereign state: United Kingdom
- Post town: Abingdon
- Postcode district: OX14
- Dialling code: 01235
- Police: Thames Valley
- Fire: Oxfordshire
- Ambulance: South Central
- UK Parliament: Didcot and Wantage

Appleford-on-Thames is a village and civil parish on the south bank of the River Thames about 2 miles (3 km) north of Didcot, in the Vale of White Horse district, in Oxfordshire. It was part of Berkshire until the 1974 local government boundary changes. The 2011 Census recorded the parish's population as 350. On 1 April 2000 the civil parish was renamed from "Appleford" to "Appleford on Thames".

== Etymology ==
Appleford-on-Thames was known as Apleford as early as the 14th century, and was spelt indifferently with one 'p' and two as late as the 18th century. The name derives from the ford across the Thames, by which the fruit grown about Hagbourne and Harwell was taken to Oxfordshire markets. The ford existed as late as the 19th century.

== Archaeology ==
Evidence of a Romano-British settlement has been found in a field south of the parish church, as well as ceramics and human burials of the same period at Manor Farm. In 1968 the Appleford Hoard of 4th-century Roman artefacts was found. It includes Roman coins, pewter ware, and ironmongery including tools, a chain and a padlock. The hoard is now in the Ashmolean Museum, Oxford.

== History ==
In the 17th century, it was customary for villagers to "goe the Perambulation", meaning to beat the bounds of the Parish, on Ascension Day.

The Appleford Feast was held on the first Sunday after St Peter's Day as late as the early 20th century, and was associated with the church.

== Manor ==
Anglo-Saxon Appleford was in existence by the last quarter of the 9th century, when King Alfred the Great of Wessex granted land there to one of his subjects. The Domesday Book records that in 1086 the manor of Apleford belonged to Abingdon Abbey. It remained so until the dissolution of the monasteries when the abbey surrendered properties including the manor of Apulford to the Crown in 1538. Farming under an open-field system prevailed in the parish until 1838 when an enclosure award was made.

== Parish church ==
The Church of England parish church of Saints Peter and Paul was originally a chapelry of Sutton Courtenay. Saints Peter and Paul parish is now part of the Benefice of Sutton Courtenay with Appleford.

The nave is 12th century Norman and the chancel was rebuilt early in the 13th century. Surviving early features include a Norman door on the south side of the nave and an Early English Gothic door to the chancel. The east and north walls of the chancel have original Early English lancet windows and the south wall has a Perpendicular Gothic window that was added in the 16th century. The building was altered in the 19th century. The nave was remodelled and extended to designs by the architect Ewan Christian, and in 1885–86 the tower was rebuilt to hang a ring of six bells, and the spire was added to designs by the architect William Gilbee Scott. Prior to this, the church had been in 'ruinous' condition, with the rebuilding only possible at the expense of Walter Justice.

Bells

The tower has a ring of six bells. The fourth bell was cast at Wokingham, Berkshire late in the 14th century, and the fifth was cast by the same foundry late in the 15th century. John Warner & Sons of Cripplegate, London cast or recast the first (treble), second, third and sixth (tenor) bells in 1886, in time to be rung for the Golden Jubilee of Queen Victoria in 1887. A plaque on the south-west wall in the church commemorates the ringing of a peal for the Millennium at noon on 1 January 2000. Currently the bells are unringable.

Organ

Samuel Green built the organ in 1777 for Abbey House of Sutton Courtenay. It was moved to Appleford parish church at a later date.

== Transport ==
In 1844 the Great Western Railway opened an extension from Didcot to Oxford, passing through Appleford parish and crossing the River Thames just north of the village. The new line included a station at Appleford, but the station was closed after just five years. In 1933 the GWR opened a new halt on the site, which continues in service today as Appleford railway station. Appleford had a bus service until 2016 when Oxfordshire County Council withdrew its subsidy. It was route 46, which ran once in each direction on a Monday morning between Clifton Hampden Post Office and Abingdon War Memorial.

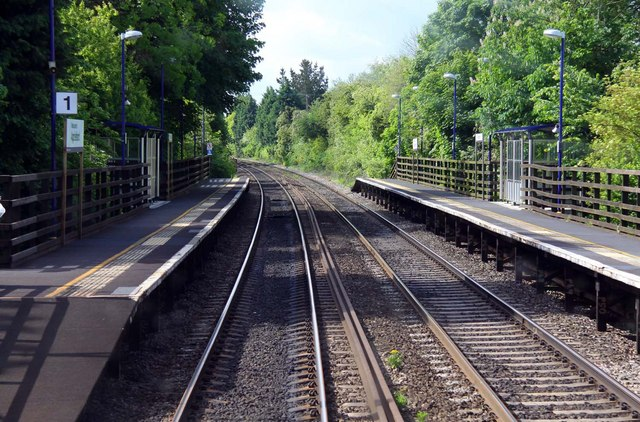
Appleford railway station

== Amenities ==
Appleford has a village hall and a Women's Institute. Appleford had a pub, the Carpenters Arms, but in 2012 it ceased trading and its owner applied for planning permission to convert it into a private house.

== Sources ==
- Brown, David (1973). "A Roman Pewter Hoard from Appleford, Berks" (PDF). Oxoniensia. XXXVIII. Oxford Architectural and Historical Society: 184–206.
- Page, W.H.; Ditchfield, P.H., eds. (1924). A History of the County of Berkshire. Victoria County History. Vol. 4. assisted by John Hautenville Cope. London: The St Katherine Press. pp. 369–379.
- Pevsner, Nikolaus (1966). Berkshire. The Buildings of England. Harmondsworth: Penguin Books. p. 65.
