= Cholsey =

Village in Oxfordshire, England

Coordinates: 51.574°N 1.151°W

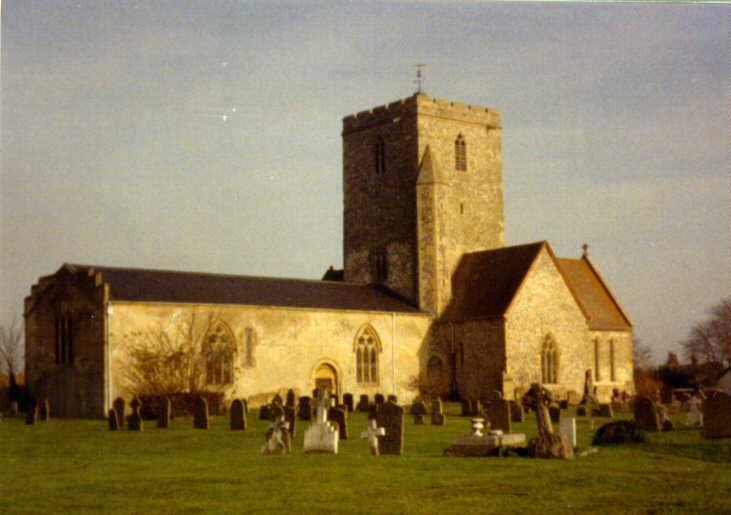
- St Mary's parish church

- Location within Oxfordshire
- Area: 16.52 km^{2} (6.38 sq mi)
- Population: 3,457 (2011 Census)
  - Density: 209/km^{2} (540/sq mi)
- OS grid reference: SU5886
  - London: 45 mi (72 km)
- Civil parish: Cholsey
- District: South Oxfordshire
- Shire county: Oxfordshire
- Region: South East
- Country: England
- Sovereign state: United Kingdom
- Post town: Wallingford
- Postcode district: OX10
- Dialling code: 01491
- Police: Thames Valley
- Fire: Oxfordshire
- Ambulance: South Central
- UK Parliament: Didcot and Wantage
- Website: Cholsey Parish Council

Cholsey is a village and civil parish immediately south of Wallingford in South Oxfordshire. Its population in 2011 was 3,457. 2011 Census. Its parish boundary, some 17 miles (27 km) long, reaches from the edge of Wallingford into the Berkshire Downs. The village green called "The Forty" has a substantial and ancient walnut tree.

Winterbrook, historically the northern part of Cholsey, was absorbed into Wallingford in 2015. Winterbrook Bridge in the parish carries the Wallingford by-pass across the River Thames. The author Dame Agatha Christie, Lady Mallowan, lived at Winterbrook House until her death. John Masefield, poet laureate, lived at Lollingdon Farm in Cholsey from 1915 to 1917. Cholsey was transferred from Wallingford Rural District in Berkshire to the district of South Oxfordshire in 1974.

== History ==
A late Bronze Age site has been found beside the River Thames at Whitecross Farm in the northeast of the parish. A pre-Roman road, the Icknield Way, crosses the River Thames at Cholsey. A find announced in 2017 was of a substantial Roman site in Celsea Place. Archaeologists discovered the best examples of corn dryers they have seen, with precision suggesting they were built by an engineer. Sites of burials and cremation pots have also been found. There is also part of a Roman villa, the majority of which appeared to have extended out under the existing road and houses and will have suffered significant unrecorded damage. The section of villa remaining within the archaeologically excavated area has been preserved in situ.

The village itself was founded on an island ("Ceol's Isle") in marshy ground close to the Thames. There is evidence that the House of Wessex royal family owned land in Cholsey in the sixth and seventh centuries. At this time the town was home to a Saint Wilgyth who was venerated locally in the Middle Ages. A royal nunnery, Cholsey Abbey, was founded in the village in 986 by Queen Dowager Ælfthryth on land given by her son, King Æthelred the Unready. The nunnery is thought to have been destroyed by invading Vikings in 1006 when they camped in Cholsey after setting nearby Wallingford ablaze.

However, Saxon masonry still survives in the Church of England parish church of St Mary. Most of this flint and stone church was built in the twelfth century. The church is cruciform. Additions were made to it in the thirteenth and fourteenth centuries. In the thirteenth-century a tithe barn was built in the village. It was, at the time, the largest aisled building in the world, being 51 feet (16 m) high, 54 feet (16 m) wide and over 300 feet (91 m) long. It was demolished in 1815. Fair Mile Hospital, a former psychiatric hospital, opened near Cholsey in 1870 and closed in 2003. In 2011–14 its Victorian buildings were converted to homes and new housing was built in its grounds.

== Transport ==
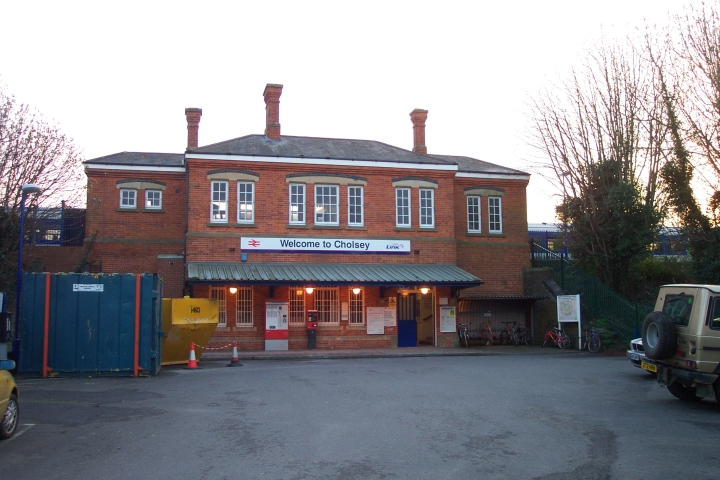
Cholsey railway station

Cholsey railway station is served by Great Western Railway stopping services on the Great Western Main Line between Reading and Didcot Parkway. The station was also the junction for a branch line to Wallingford, nicknamed the "Wallingford Bunk", which the heritage Cholsey and Wallingford Railway now operates on bank holidays and some weekends. From Mondays to Saturdays Thames Travel bus route 136 links Cholsey with Wallingford and Benson. There is no evening, Sunday or bank holiday service.

== Architecture and buildings ==
Writer and poet John Masefield lived in the parish for several years during the First World War as tenant of Lollingdon Farm at the foot of the Berkshire Downs. He was Poet Laureate from 1936 to his death in 1967 and wrote a series of poems and sonnets called Lollingdon Downs. The farmhouse, on Westfield Road, has been listed grade II since 1986.

The architect Edward Prioleau Warren (1856–1937), lived at Breach House, in Halfpenny Lane, Cholsey, built in 1906, which he designed for himself. The building is grade II listed.

=== St Mary's churchyard ===
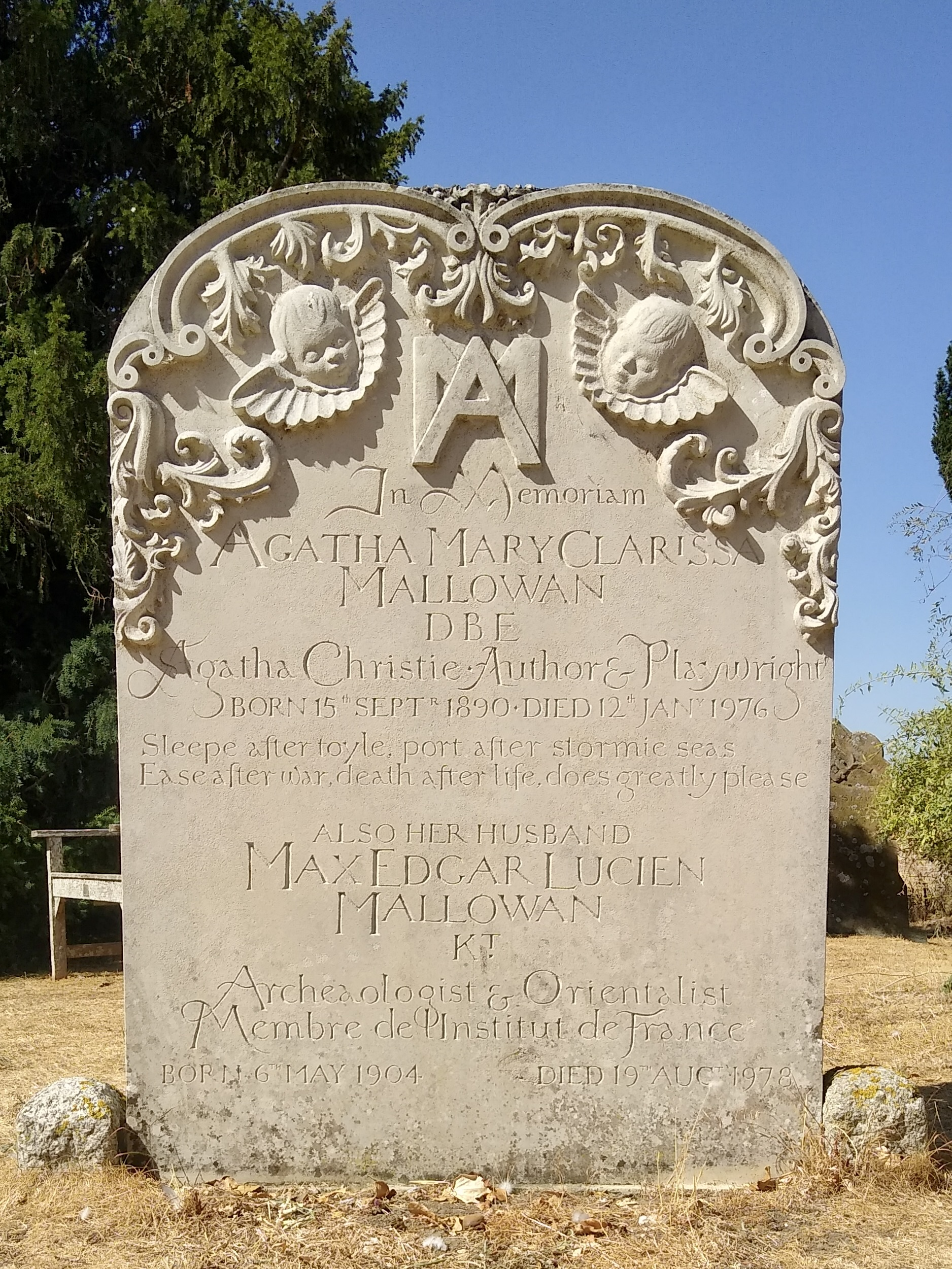
Gravestone of Agatha Christie and her husband Max Mallowan at St Mary's Church

The grave of novelist Dame Agatha Christie is in the churchyard of St Mary's. She lived with her second husband, the archaeologist Sir Max Mallowan, at Winterbrook House, formerly in the north of the parish, from about 1934 and died there in 1976. She and her husband had chosen a burial plot in the mid-1960s just under the perimeter wall of the churchyard. About twenty journalists and television reporters attended her funeral service, some having travelled from as far away as South America. Thirty wreaths adorned her grave including one from the cast of her long-running play The Mousetrap, and another sent "on behalf of the multitude of grateful readers" from the Ulverscroft Large Print Book Publishers.

== Sources ==
- Betjeman, John, ed. (1968). Collins Pocket Guide to English Parish Churches. Vol. The South. London: Collins. p. 112.
- Cromarty, Anne Marie; Barclay, Alistair; Lambrick, George; Robinson, Mark (2006). "Chapter 2: Whitecross Farm, Cholsey: A Late Bronze Age Waterfront Site" (PDF). Late Bronze Age Ritual at Whitecross Farm, Wallingford. Thames Valley Landscape Series. Vol. 22. Oxford: Oxford University School of Archaeology. pp. 9–46. ISBN 0-947816-67-4.
- Ditchfield, PH; Page, William, eds. (1924). A History of the County of Berkshire. Victoria County History. Vol. IV. assisted by John Hautenville Cope. London: The St Katherine Press. pp. 296–302.
- Gray, A Stuart (1985). Edwardian Architecture: A Biographical Dictionary. London: Gerald Duckworth & Co. p. 371. ISBN 978-0715610121.
- Lysons, Daniel; Lysons, Samuel (1806). Magna Britannia: being a concise topographical account of the several counties of Great Britain. Vol. 1: Containing Bedfordshire, Berkshire, and Buckinghamshire.
- Pevsner, Nikolaus (1966). Berkshire. The Buildings of England. Harmondsworth: Penguin Books. pp. 115–117.
- Yurdan, Marilyn (2010). Oxfordshire Graves and Gravestones. Stroud: The History Press.
