= Cholsey railway station =

Railway station in Oxfordshire, England

Coordinates: 51°34′10.20″N 1°09′28.44″W

Cholsey
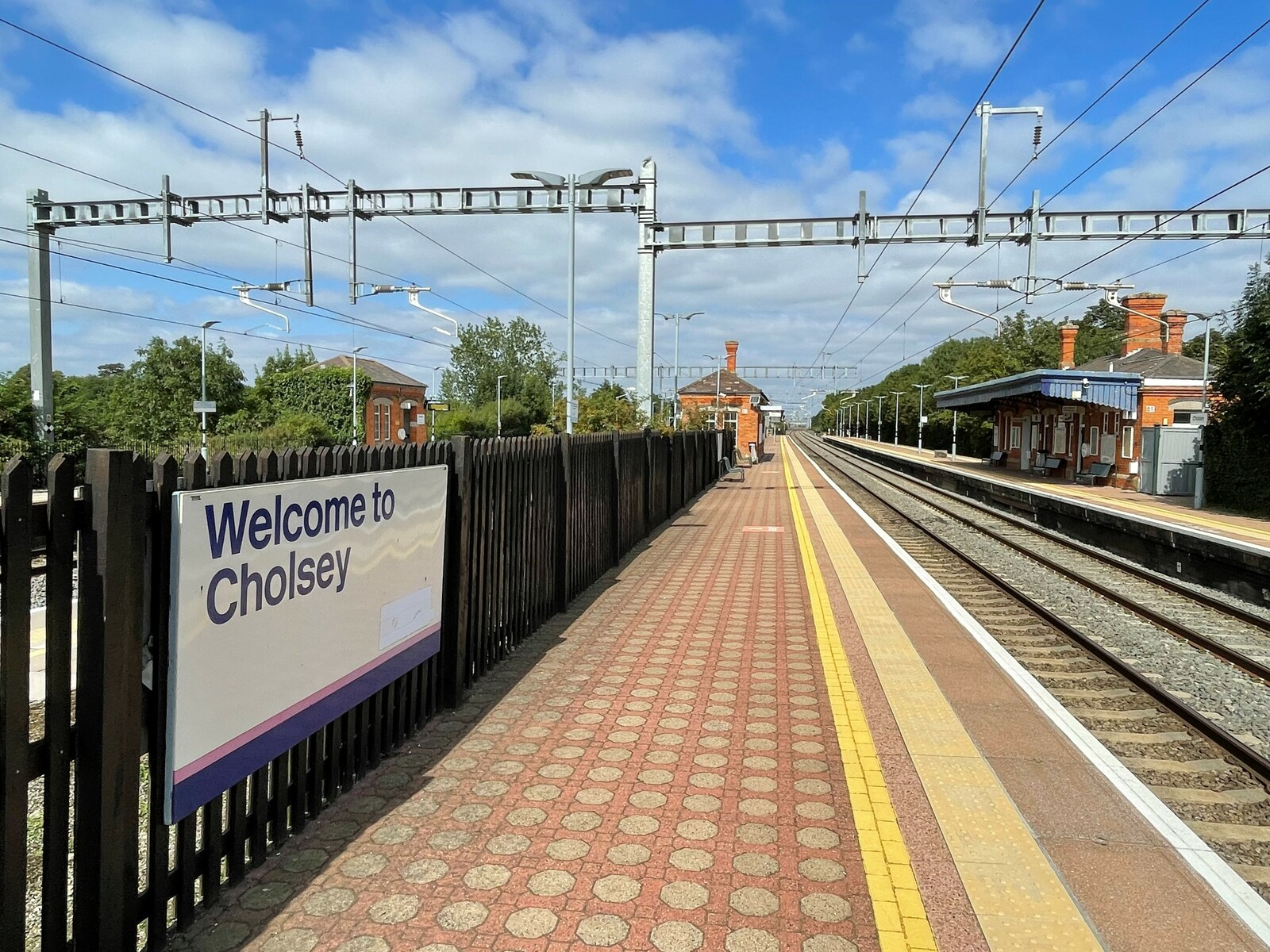
- View towards Didcot Parkway, following electrification (2019)

General information
- Location: Cholsey, District of South Oxfordshire; England
- Grid reference: SU584860
- Managed by: Great Western Railway
- Platforms: 5

Other information
- Station code: CHO
- Classification: DfT category E

History
- Opened: 29 February 1892
- Original company: Great Western Railway
- Pre-grouping: Great Western Railway
- Post-grouping: Great Western Railway

Key dates
- 1 June 1840: GWR Reading to Steventon opened
- 29 February 1892: Station opens as Cholsey and Moulsford
- c1950: Renamed Cholsey

Passengers
- 2020/21: ▼54,628
- 2021/22: ▲0.155 million
- 2022/23: ▲0.212 million
- 2023/24: ▲0.241 million
- 2024/25: ▲0.275 million
Location
Notes
- Passenger statistics from the Office of Rail and Road

Cholsey railway station (previously Cholsey & Moulsford) serves the village of Cholsey and the town of Wallingford, in south Oxfordshire, England. It is 48 miles 37 chains (78.0 km) down the line from London Paddington and is situated between Goring & Streatley to the east and Didcot Parkway to the west.

The station is managed by Great Western Railway, which operates local services to Didcot Parkway, Oxford, Reading and London Paddington. Cholsey is also the junction for the heritage railway services on the Cholsey and Wallingford Railway.

== History ==
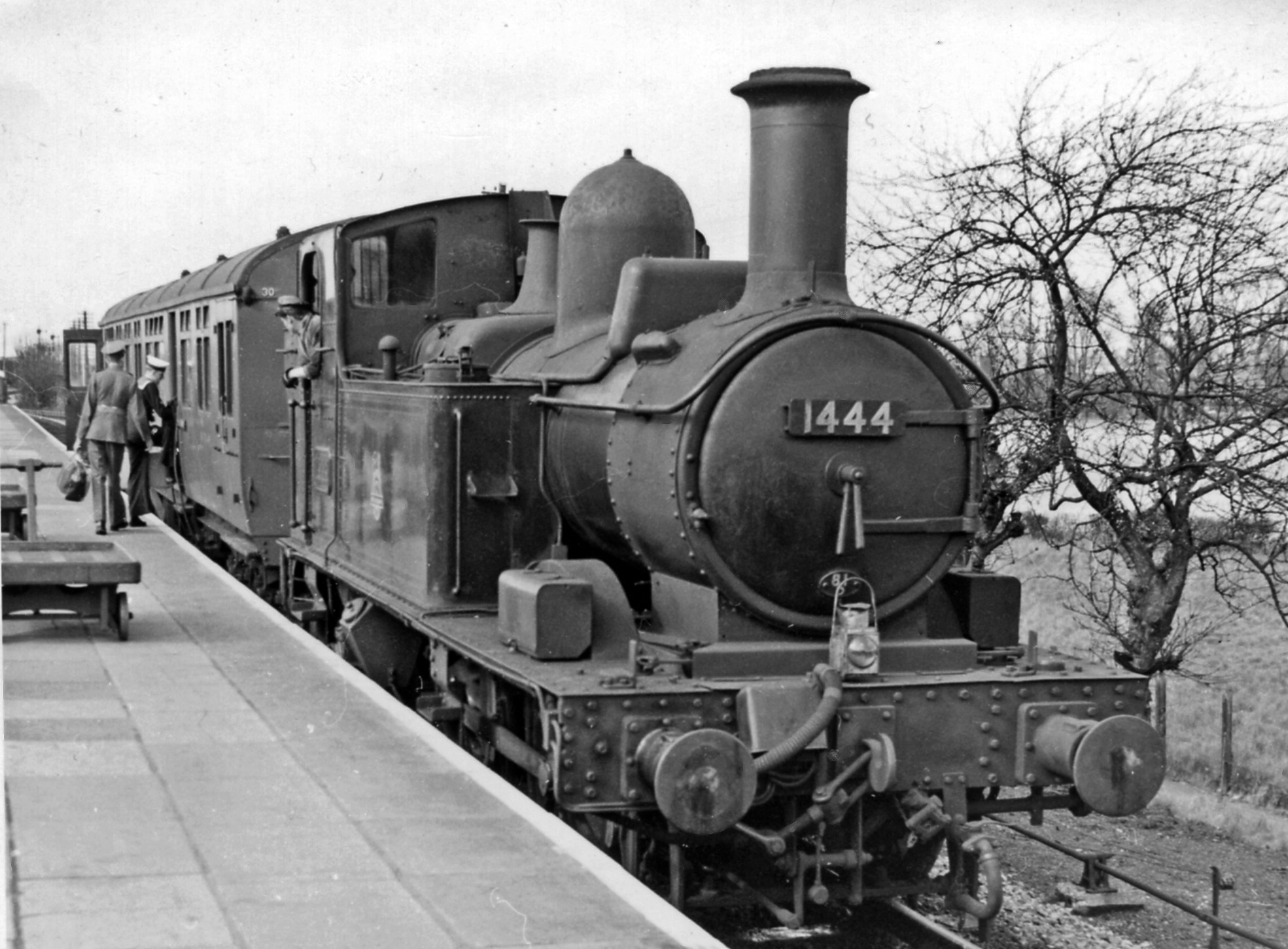
A Wallingford branch train in 1959

The station is on the original line of the Great Western Railway, which opened on 1 June 1840. The original station, opened with the line known as Wallingford Road, was several hundred yards further up the main line towards Goring & Streatley, just east of the point where the A329 road crosses the line (grid reference SU592851). Some of the original station buildings can still be seen at this point. On 2 July 1866 Wallingford Road station was renamed Moulsford and the branch to Wallingford was opened five days later; whilst the junction for this was at Moulsford station, the branch line track ran parallel to the main line for nearly 1 mile (1.6 km) before curving away.

In 1892, during quadrupling of the main line, the junction for Wallingford was resited closer to the point of divergence and a new station was built there. On 29 February 1892, the new station opened and Moulsford station closed.

The Wallingford branch closed to passenger trains in 1959 and to freight trains in 1981. Part of it is now preserved as the Cholsey and Wallingford Railway.

== Layout ==
The station frontage building is on two levels, with station offices in the lower (street) level and the London bound waiting room on the upper (platform) level. There are two small car parks, one at street level in front of the station building, the other at platform level to the south of the station.

The station has platforms on each of the fast and relief (slow) lines, although the platforms on the fast lines see little use. It also has a terminal platform used by trains on the Wallingford line. The platforms are located on an embankment, with access to street level by stairs and a pedestrian underpass.

- Platform 1 is only used when the relief lines are out of service. It is for down GWR services during engineering and maintenance work.
- Platform 2 is only used when the relief lines are out of service. It is for up GWR services during engineering and maintenance work.
- Platform 3 for down GWR local services towards Didcot Parkway and Oxford.
- Platform 4 for up GWR local services towards Reading and London Paddington.
- Platform 5 is a west-facing bay platform, currently used for Cholsey and Wallingford Railway heritage services to Wallingford.

== Services ==
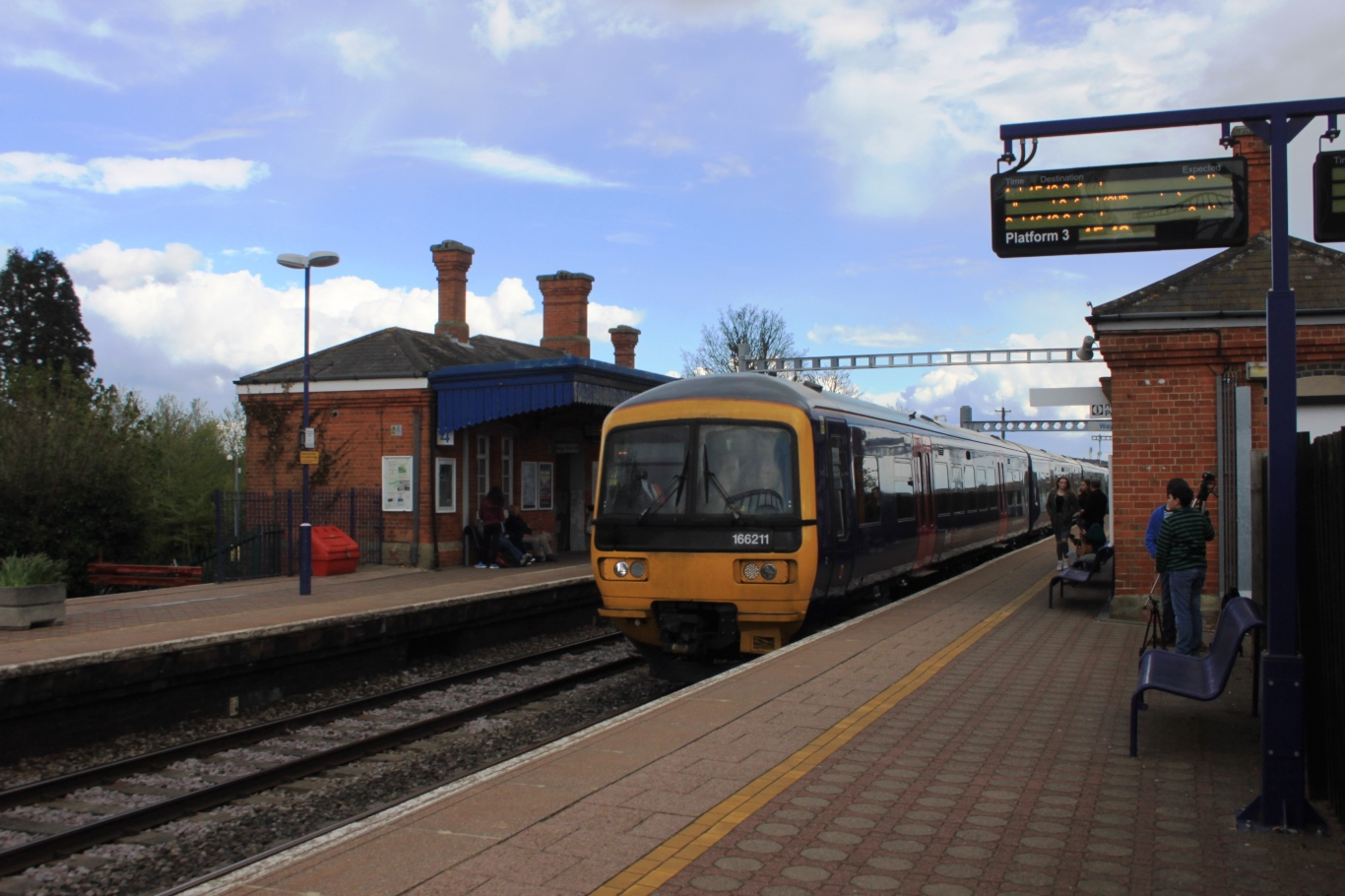
A Great Western Railway service to Oxford

National Rail services at Cholsey are operated by Great Western Railway using Class 387 electric multiple units.

The typical off-peak is two trains per hour in each direction between London Paddington and Didcot Parkway. On Sundays, the service is reduced to hourly in each direction.

Services on the volunteer-run Cholsey and Wallingford Railway run intermittently, usually on weekends and bank holidays.

Preceding station	National Rail	Following station
Didcot Parkway	Great Western Railway Great Western Main Line Stopping Services	Goring & Streatley
Preceding station	Heritage railways	Following station
Wallingford Terminus	Cholsey & Wallingford Railway	Terminus
Historical railways
Moulsford Line open, station closed	Great Western Railway Great Western Main Line	Didcot Line and station open
Wallingford Line open, station closed	British Rail Western Region Wallingford Branch Line	Terminus
