= Steventon, Oxfordshire =

Village in Oxfordshire, England

Coordinates: 51.625°N 1.320°W

Steventon
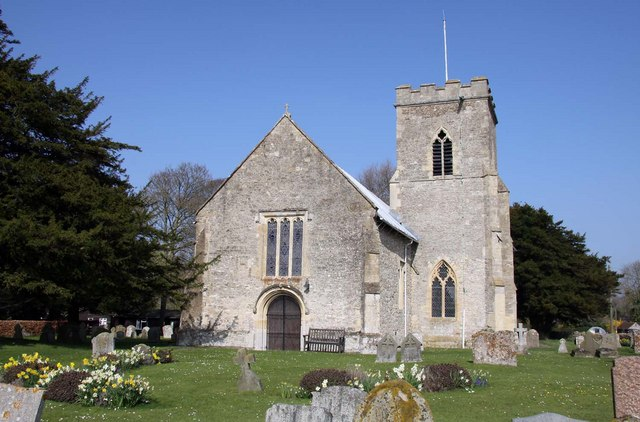
- St Michael and All Angels parish church

- Location within Oxfordshire
- Population: 1,485 (2011 Census)
- OS grid reference: SU465915
- Civil parish: Steventon
- District: Vale of White Horse
- Shire county: Oxfordshire
- Region: South East
- Country: England
- Sovereign state: United Kingdom
- Post town: Abingdon
- Postcode district: OX13
- Dialling code: 01235
- Police: Thames Valley
- Fire: Oxfordshire
- Ambulance: South Central
- UK Parliament: Didcot and Wantage
- Website: Steventon Oxfordshire Village Web

Steventon is a village and civil parish in Oxfordshire, England, about 4 miles (6.4 km) south of Abingdon and a similar distance west of Didcot. It lies within the boundaries of the historic county of Berkshire. The 2011 Census recorded the parish population as 1,485.

== Toponym ==
Steventon's toponym evolved from Stivetune in the 11th century via Estiventona in the 12th century, Stiveton, Stivington, Estiventon, Stiventon, Stuvinton and Steveington in the 13th century and Stephyngton in the 16th century before reaching its present form.

== Priory ==
Steventon Priory was founded early in the 12th century in the reign of Henry I. It was an alien priory, controlled by the Benedictine Bec Abbey in Normandy. In the 14th century alien priories became unpopular with the Crown, and in the reign of Edward III the abbey was allowed to sell Steventon Priory to an English squire, Sir Hugh Calveley.

== Church and chapel ==
=== Church of England ===
The Domesday Book of 1086 records a church in the manor of Steventon. The earliest part of the present Church of England parish church of St Michael and All Angels is a capital in the south arcade. It is in "stiff-leaf" style, which is an Early English feature. Page and Ditchfield concluded that it dated from about 1220. In the 14th century St Michael's was rebuilt in Perpendicular Gothic style and apparently enlarged for Sir Hugh Calveley. The position of the tower is slightly unusual, on the south side of the nave and combined with the porch. The south aisle is of three and a half bays, parallelling the chancel and the eastern part of the nave, and having at its west end an arch into the bottom stage of the tower.

St Michael's is a Grade I listed building. Its parish is now linked with those of Drayton and Milton. The tower has a ring of six bells. William Yare of Reading, Berkshire cast the fourth and tenor bells in 1613. Henry I Knight, also of Reading, cast the second bell in 1617. Ellis II Knight and Henry III Knight cast the treble bell in 1674. William Taylor of Loughborough cast the third and fifth bells in 1849, presumably at the foundry in Oxford that his family ran until 1854.

=== Methodist ===
A Wesleyan chapel was built in Steventon in 1861. It is a Gothic revival brick building on Oxford Road, near the bridge over the railway and the site of the former railway station. It became Steventon Methodist Church and was used for worship until the early 21st century. By 2009 the church had closed for worship and was advertised for sale.

== Economic and social history ==
The Causeway is a medieval cobbled path and former road nearly 1 mile (1.6 km) long running almost east–west through the village linking St Michael's church with the Abingdon – Newbury main road. The south side of the Causeway is lined by houses, a number of which are medieval timber-framed buildings. Steventon is on what used to be the main road between Oxford, Abingdon and Newbury. The section from Oxford and Abingdon through Steventon to Chilton Pond was turnpiked in 1755. From the 1920s it was classified the A34 road. In the 1970s the A34 was re-routed as a dual carriageway bypassing Abingdon, Drayton and Steventon, and the section between Steventon Hill and Abingdon was detrunked and reclassified as the B4017.

The route of the abandoned Wilts & Berks Canal passes through the west of Steventon parish, about 1 3/4 miles (2.8 km) west-northwest of the village. Building had begun in 1796 at Semington Junction in Wiltshire and reached West Challow in 1807. The final section, from West Challow through Steventon to Abingdon, was completed in 1810. There was a Steventon Lock in the parish. Traffic on the canal had virtually ceased by 1901 and the route was formally abandoned in 1914. The Wilts & Berks Canal Trust is currently restoring the canal. In June 1840 the Great Western Railway opened Steventon railway station. It was the main station for Oxford, 10 miles (16 km) to the north, until in 1844 the line from Didcot to Oxford was opened. British Railways closed Steventon station in 1964. The nearest station is now Didcot Parkway, about 4 miles (6.4 km) east of Steventon.

In 1845–46, the African-American abolitionist and fugitive slave Harriet Jacobs stayed for several months at the vicarage with Reverend William Vincent and his wife Anne, sister-in-law of the then-famous American author Nathaniel Parker Willis who employed her as a nanny for his young daughter. The village is mentioned in her book Incidents in the Life of a Slave Girl, Written by Herself.

Inclosure (Steventon) Provisional Order Confirmation Act 1880
- Act of Parliament
- Parliament of the United Kingdom
- Long title: An Act to confirm the Provisional Order for the inclosure of certain Lands known as the Common Fields, the Common Meadow Lands, the Cow Common, the Green, the Meres, Baulks, and other waste lands, situate in the parish of Steventon, in the county of Berks, in pursuance of a Report of the Inclosure Commissioners for England and Wales.
- Citation: 43 & 44 Vict. c. lxxxviii

Dates
- Royal assent: 2 August 1880

Text of statute as originally enacted

Steventon was the last place in North Berkshire to continue open field farming. Parliament passed the Ardington Inclosure Act 1808 (48 Geo. 3. c. 74 Pr.), an inclosure act for Steventon's common land in 1808, but it was not implemented. In 1880 Parliament passed a second act to enclose the parish, the Inclosure (Steventon) Provisional Order Confirmation Act 1880 (43 & 44 Vict. c. lxxxviii). The enclosure award was made in 1883 and implemented in 1885.

During a party in the early hours of New Year's Day 2003 Robert Tyrrell, the then landlord of the North Star pub in Steventon, bulldozed part of his own pub after his barman refused to serve him. Tyrrell was sentenced to 200 hours of community service and fined more than £3,000. The pub was repaired and re-opened by December 2003. The 17th-century timber-framed building is Grade II listed, and its restoration cost Tyrrell more than £100,000. In 2007 the work won a Vale of White Horse Design Scheme Award for Andrew Townsend, a local architect from Faringdon who designed the pub's restoration.

== Amenities ==
Steventon has three public houses: the Cherry Tree controlled by Wadworth Brewery, The Fox and the North Star (see above). The North Star retains many 19th-century features, including a serving-hatch instead of a bar, and ale being poured directly from casks instead of drawn by hand pumps from a cellar. Steventon has a bakery, a Co-operative store and a village hall. Steventon has a Sports and Social Club and the village green has a cricket pitch. The Fox, the North Star and the Sports and Social Club all have Aunt Sally teams that play in the Abingdon and District Aunt Sally League. The Truck Festival is an annual music festival held near Steventon each July.

== Gallery ==
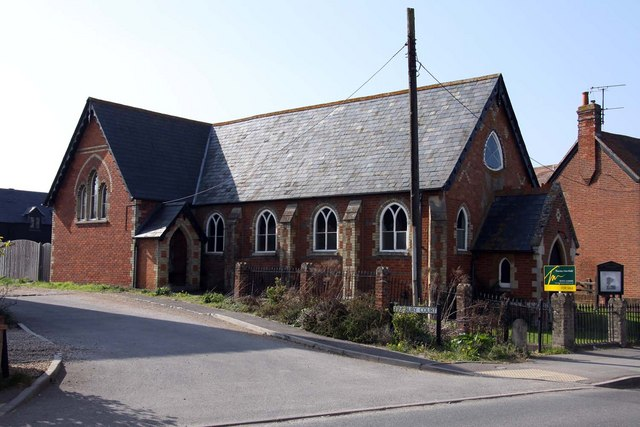
Steventon Methodist Church

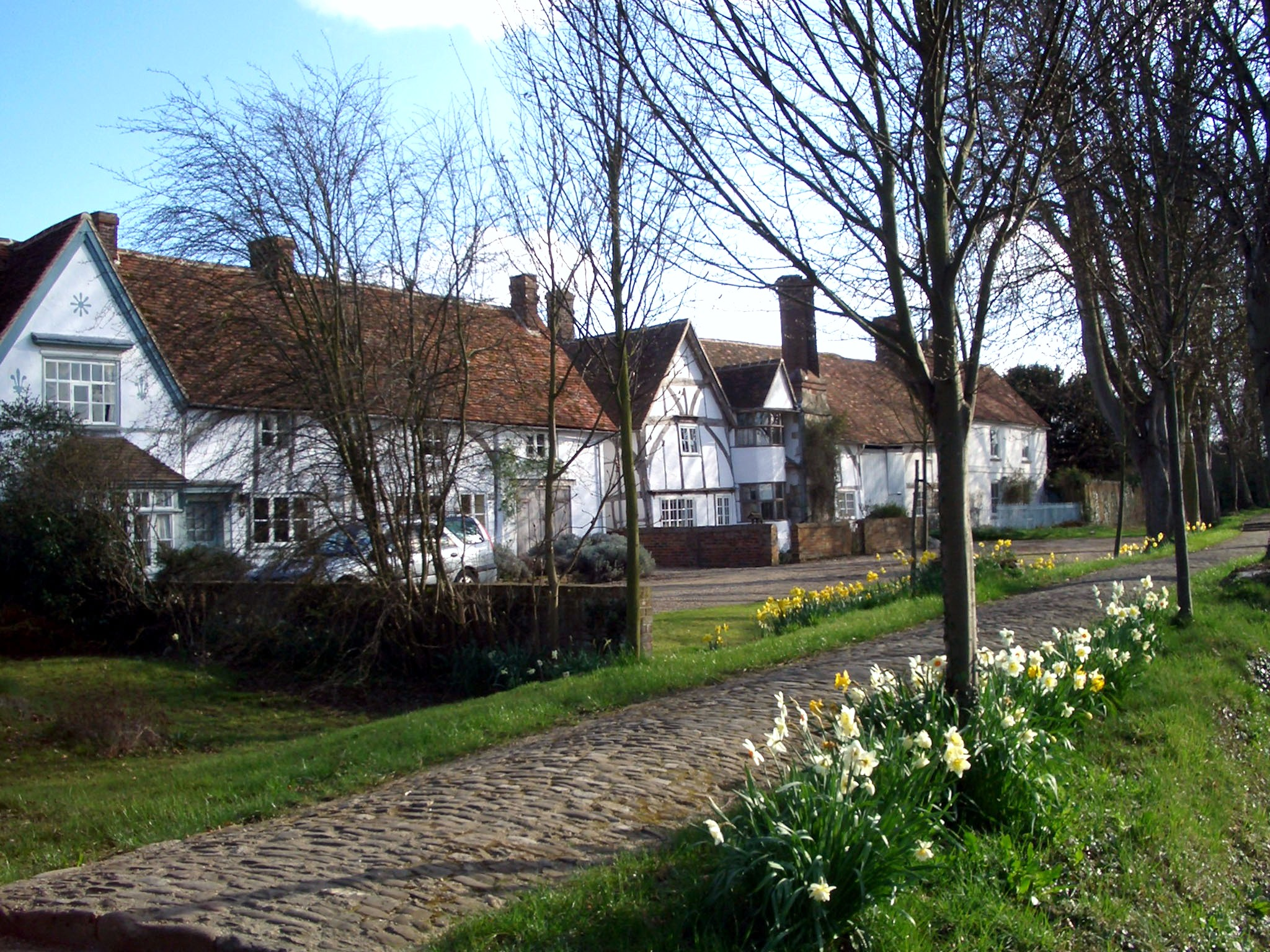
69–81 The Causeway, a row of timber-framed houses built probably in the 16th century

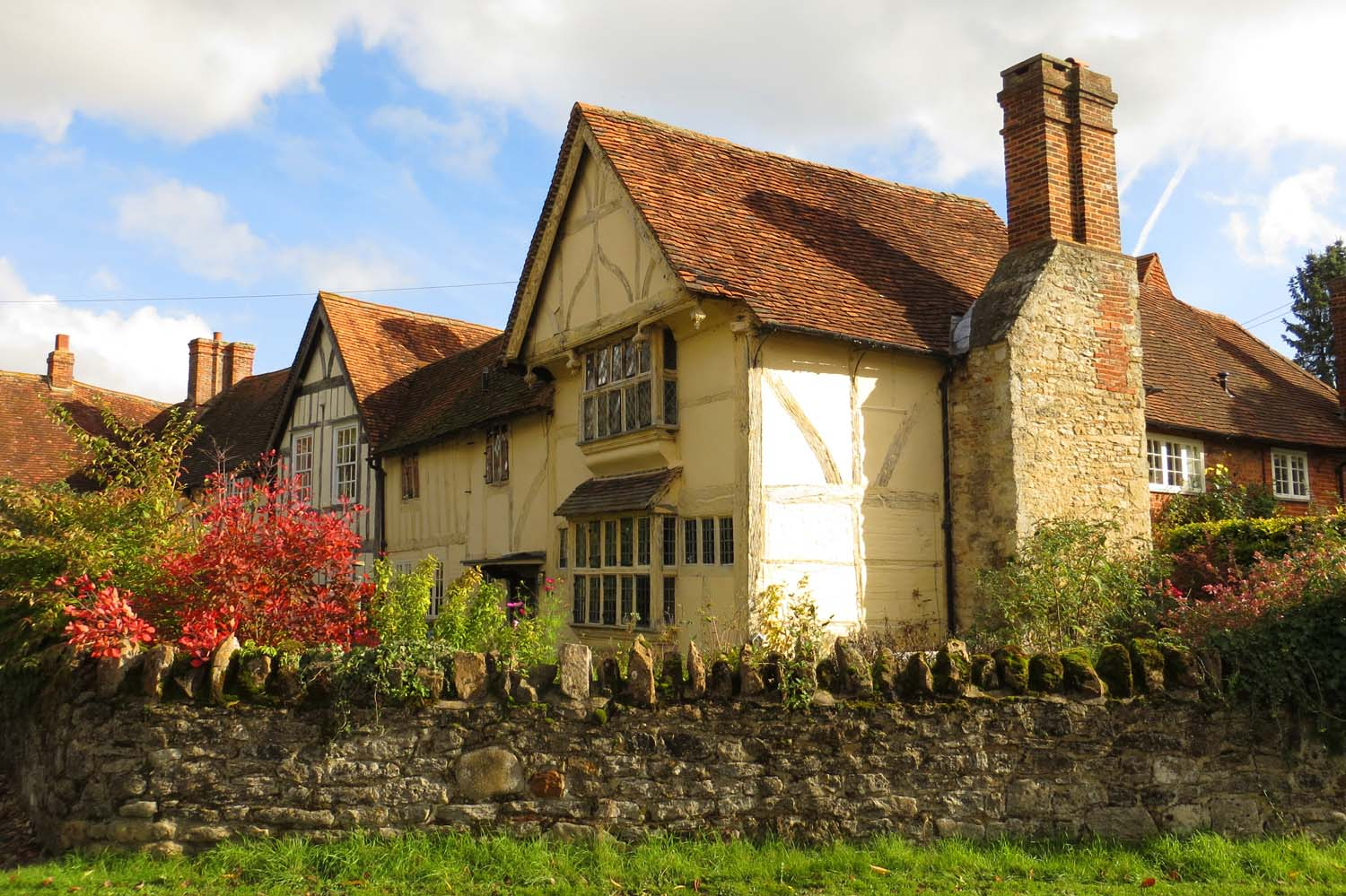
Priory Cottages, 123–127 The Causeway, have 14th-century origins and were developed in the 15th and 16th centuries. They are Grade II* listed.

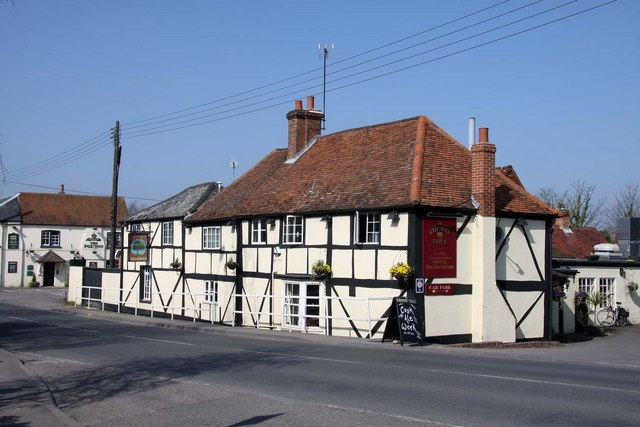
The Cherry Tree pub

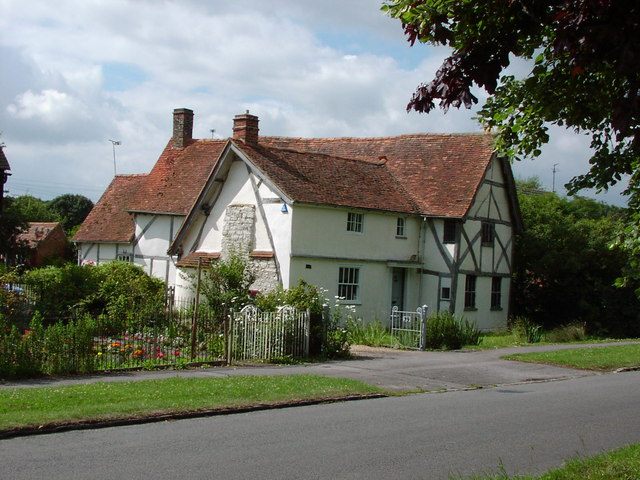
39 The Causeway is a late 14th-century timber-framed house, extended in the 15th and 17th centuries. It is Grade II* listed. A cruck frame and an external bread oven are visible in the gable wall nearest the camera.

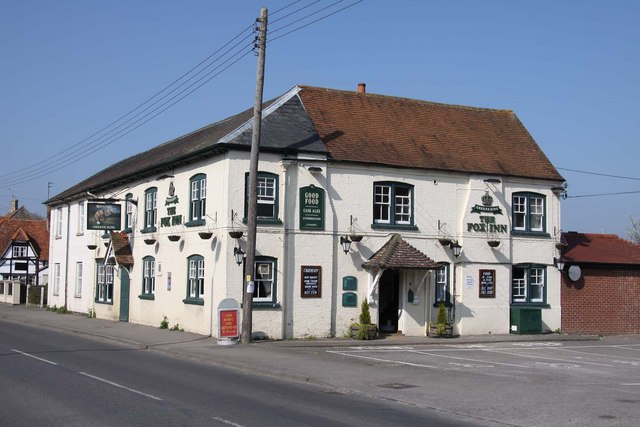
The Fox Inn

== Sources and further reading ==
- Dalby, L.J. (2000) [1971]. The Wilts and Berks Canal (3rd ed.). Usk: Oakwood Press. ISBN 0-85361-562-4.
- Ditchfield, P.H.; Page, W.H., eds. (1907). A History of the County of Berkshire. Victoria County History. Vol. 2. London: Archibald Constable & Co. pp. 112–113.
- Page, W.H.; Ditchfield, P.H., eds. (1924). A History of the County of Berkshire. Victoria County History. Vol. 4. assisted by John Hautenville Cope. London: The St Katherine Press. pp. 365–369.
- Pevsner, Nikolaus (1966). Berkshire. The Buildings of England. Harmondsworth: Penguin Books. pp. 227–228.
- Jacobs, Harriet A. (1861). "XXXVII. A Visit To England". In Child, Lydia Maria (ed.). Incidents in the Life of a Slave Girl, Written by Herself. Boston: Linda Brent – via Project Gutenberg.
