= Appleford railway station =

Railway station in Oxfordshire, England

Coordinates: 51.640°N 1.242°W

Appleford
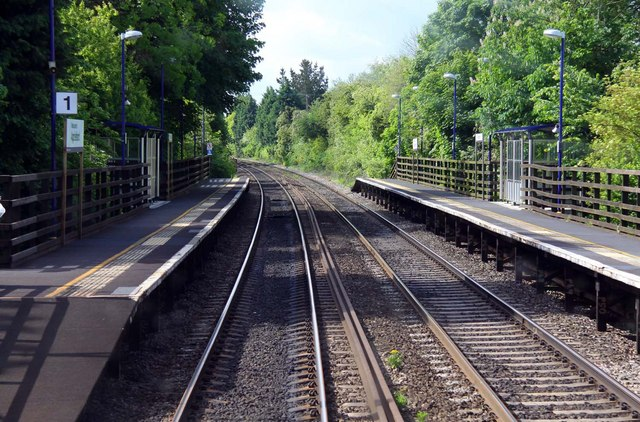

General information
- Location: Appleford-on-Thames, Vale of White Horse; England
- Grid reference: SU525936
- Manager: Great Western Railway
- Platforms: 2

Other information
- Station code: APF
- Classification: DfT category F2

History
- Original company: Great Western Railway
- Pre-grouping: GWR
- Post-grouping: GWR

Key dates
- 12 June 1844: Station opened with the line
- February 1849: Station closed
- 11 September 1933: Station reopened as Appleford Halt
- 5 May 1969: Renamed Appleford

Passengers
- 2021/22: ▲5,336
- 2022/23: ▲7,234
- 2023/24: ▲7,306
- 2024/25: ▲9,074
- 2025/26: ▲9,090
Location
Notes
- Passenger statistics from the Office of Rail and Road

Appleford railway station serves the village of Appleford-on-Thames in Oxfordshire, England, as well as nearby settlements such as Sutton Courtenay. It is on the Cherwell Valley Line between Didcot Parkway and Banbury, 55 miles 16 chains (88.8 km) measured from London Paddington. The station and all trains serving it are operated by Great Western Railway.

== Layout ==
The station entrance is on a humpback bridge and passengers must descend steep steps to the platforms.

Platform 1 is for Down trains towards Oxford, and Platform 2 is for Up trains towards Didcot Parkway. South of the station is a pedestrian level crossing; the barrier is normally lowered with lights off. The user has to press a button for the signaller to raise the barriers; then they are lowered again once the user is clear of the crossing. The lights are only used to warn people that the barriers are coming down.

== History ==
The station opened originally with the line from Didcot to Oxford, on 12 June 1844. It had been planned and partly built by the Oxford Railway, which was absorbed into the Great Western Railway before the opening of the line. It was however closed after just a few years in February 1849.

The Great Western Railway reopened the station as "Appleford Halt" on 11 September 1933 in response to growing competition from buses.

The station then passed to the Western Region of British Railways on nationalisation in 1948.

British Rail discontinued its "Halt" suffix on 5 May 1969. The station was served by Network SouthEast when sectorisation was introduced in the 1980s.

Unusually, until recently it retained the original wooden platforms and corrugated iron pagoda-roofed waiting shelters. These have been replaced by "bus shelter"-like waiting shelters. The station has never been staffed; originally passengers could buy tickets at the village post office, but since this has closed, they need to buy tickets from the guard (or as an e-Ticket via a Phone App).

== Services ==
All services at Appleford are operated by Great Western Railway.

The typical off-peak service is one train every two hours in each direction between Didcot Parkway and Oxford, with most trains continuing beyond Oxford to and from Banbury. Additional services call at the station during the peak hours.

No services call at the station on Sundays.

Preceding station	National Rail	Following station
Didcot Parkway	Great Western Railway Cherwell Valley Line Monday-Saturday only	Culham
