= Wallingford railway station (England) =

Railway station in Oxfordshire, England

Wallingford
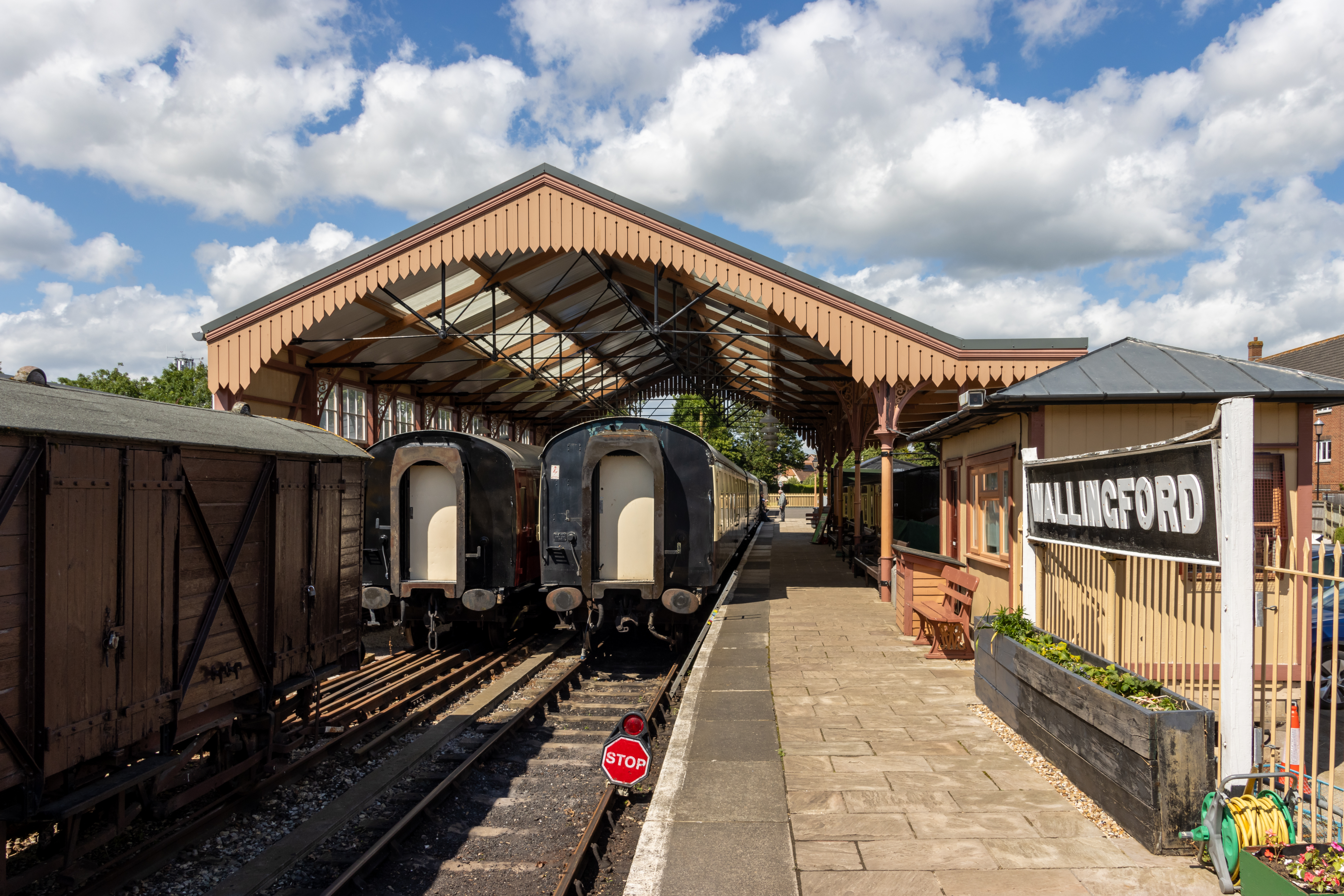

General information
- Location: Wallingford, South Oxfordshire, Oxfordshire; England
- Coordinates: 51.5978°N 1.1352°W
- Grid reference: SU600891
- System: Station on heritage railway
- Platforms: 1

History
- Original company: Wallingford & Watlington Railway
- Pre-grouping: Great Western Railway
- Post-grouping: Great Western Railway; Western Region of British Railways; Cholsey and Wallingford Railway

Key dates
- 1866: Opened
- 1959: Passenger services ceased
- 1965: Goods services ceased
- 1969: demolished
- 1985: Reopened as heritage railway station 500m south of original location
Location

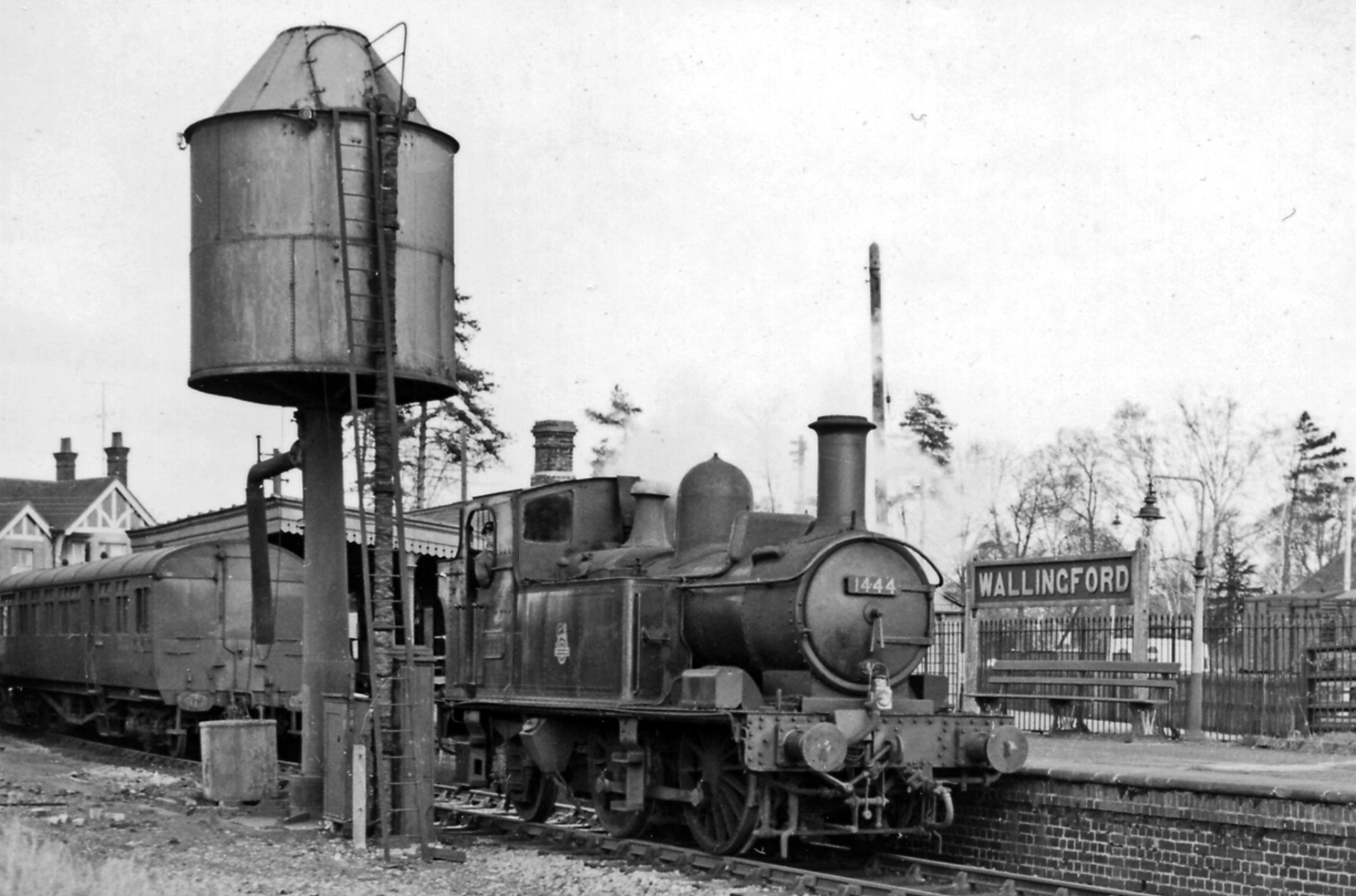
Auto-train and (detached) 0-4-2T in 1959

Wallingford railway station is a railway station serving the town of Wallingford. It is now part of a preserved railway.

== History ==
On 2 July 1866, the Wallingford railway branch line was opened by the Wallingford and Watlington Railway from a junction with the Great Western Railway (GWR) main line at Moulsford (known as Wallingford Road until that date) to Wallingford, where a station was constructed on the south side of Wantage Road (now Station Road), at grid reference SU602895 (51.6017°N 1.1320°W). The line never proceeded beyond, so did not reach the second-named town in its title.

For such a short line and a small station, the location was well patronised by commercial freight customers. The original Wallingford creamery was taken over by the Co-op Wholesale Society, and had its own private siding access from the goods yard to allow access for milk trains, which then took product to London until the late 1950s. There was also a Malting plant with rail access.

Passenger services were withdrawn in 1959 and general freight services finished in 1965. In 1969 the line was shortened by 500 metres (1,600 ft), back to the location of the malting plant on Hithercroft Road, which was the only remaining goods customer. When traffic from the maltings stopped in 1981 the line was closed and British Rail removed the junction at Cholsey.

A new Wallingford station was built on the south side of St. Johns Road, at grid reference SU600891, when the line reopened as a heritage railway.

== Services ==
Preceding station	Heritage railways	Following station
Cholsey Terminus	Cholsey & Wallingford Railway	Terminus
Disused railways
Cholsey; Line and station open	British Rail; Western Region; Wallingford Branch Line	Terminus
