= Cholsey and Wallingford Railway =

Railway line in Oxfordshire, England

Coordinates: 51.59769°N 1.13472°W

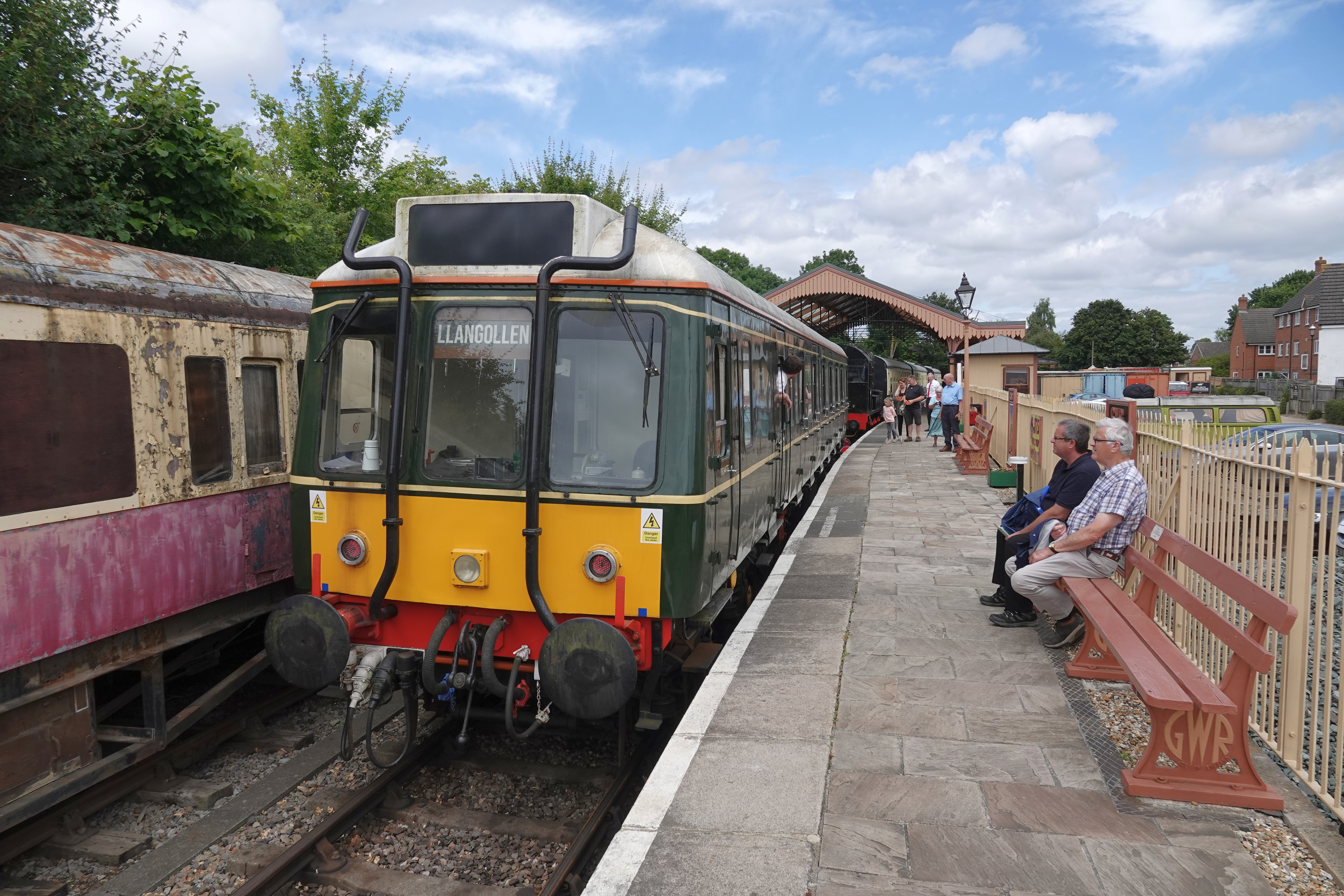
- Class 121 'Bubblecar' 55034 at Wallingford

Commercial operations
- Built by: Wallingford and Watlington Railway
- Original gauge: 4 ft 8 1/2 in (1,435 mm) standard gauge

Preserved operations
- Operated by: Cholsey and Wallingford Railway
- Length: 2 1/2 mi (4 km)
- Preserved gauge: 4 ft 8 1/2 in (1,435 mm) standard gauge

Commercial history
- Opened: 1866
- Closed: passenger 1959 freight 1965/1981

Preservation history
- 1985: Initial service
- 1997: Full service
- Headquarters: Wallingford

The Cholsey and Wallingford Railway is a 2 1/2-mile (4 km) long standard gauge heritage railway in the English county of Oxfordshire. It operates along most of the length of the former Wallingford branch of the Great Western Railway (GWR), from Cholsey station, 12 miles (19 km) north of Reading on the Great Western Main Line, to a station on the outskirts of the nearby town of Wallingford.

== History ==
The first proposals for the Cholsey to Wallingford line date from 1861, and envisaged an independently owned route from Cholsey to Princes Risborough via Wallingford, Benson, Watlington and Chinnor. This line would have been a through route, with junctions with the Great Western Railway at Cholsey and the Wycombe Railway at Princes Risborough. In 1862, a bill was presented to Parliament for a short branch from Cholsey to Wallingford, but this was withdrawn early in 1863, before it had come up for consideration. It was replaced by the Wallingford and Watlington Railway Bill which was passed by Parliament as the Wallingford and Watlington Railway Act 1864 (27 & 28 Vict. c. cclxvi) in July 1864.

The W&WR opened as far as Wallingford on 2 July 1866. (Note: In An Illustrated History of the Wallingford Branch, Karau and Turner say Monday, 7 July 1866, as does Jenkins in Oxfordshire Railways Through Time, but this includes a calendar error and is contradicted by contemporary press reports in Jacksons Oxford Journal, referenced below, London Evening Standard and Oxford Times.) Unfortunately, two months earlier, in May 1866, the Overend, Gurney & Co bank had crashed, causing the severest financial crisis of the nineteenth century. The bank rate was raised to 10%, making it impossible for the W&WR to raise the capital for its planned continuation to Watlington. In 1871, Parliament consented to the railway abandoning its plans for the line beyond Wallingford. The company was sold to the GWR in 1872.

The railway became popularly known as the Wallingford Bunk. The curator of the Cholsey and Wallingford Railway Museum attributes the following story to the late Mrs Harold Gale. "Around the turn of the century, the loco did a 'bunk'. It left Cholsey station without its coaches. Harold and Len Gale, returning from football in Reading, had uncoupled the loco while it waited in the bay platform."

The line closed to passengers in 1959, and the last British Rail goods traffic into the old Wallingford Station ran in 1965. However most of the line was retained to serve the maltings adjacent to the railway to the south of Hithercroft Road, Wallingford. Rail service to this plant ceased in 1981 when BR removed the junction at Cholsey. The Cholsey and Wallingford Railway Preservation Society was then formed to conserve the line for tourist services. It first ran train rides for the public in 1985, with regular advertised services over the full available length of the line beginning in 1997. Steam traction has also been reintroduced.

In 2026, services were suspended for approximately one month after a traffic collision at the crossing with the A4130.

== Services ==
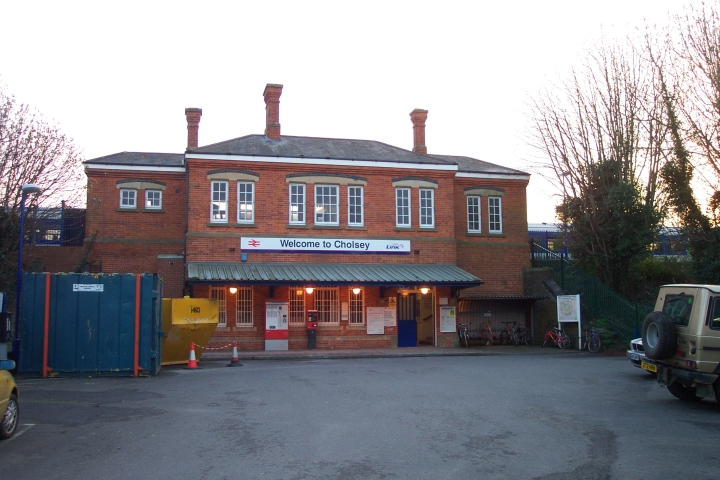
Cholsey railway station from street level; the Cholsey and Wallingford branch platform is at upper level to right of building

Most services on the Cholsey and Wallingford Railway are currently hauled by the Class 08 resident diesel locomotives with visiting steam locomotives for special events. Trains run on weekends and bank holidays between April and September, and at Halloween and Christmas. The railway's web site has details of operating days.

The original branch platform at Cholsey station is now used by the CWR, and trains connect there with Great Western Railway stopping services on the Great Western Main Line between Reading and Didcot stations.

The original Wallingford railway station and the last segment of the line have long been built on, and the old station site is now crossed by Beeching Way. The line now terminates at a makeshift station which is the railway's headquarters on Hithercroft Road (formerly known as Old Moor Lane). The new station is adjacent to the site of the maltings that kept the line alive into the preservation era. The maltings were demolished early in the new millennium and replaced by housing, releasing some extra land to the railway. The CWR plans to build a permanent station when resources are available.

== Rolling stock ==
=== Locomotives ===
The line is the home to one Sentinel steam locomotive and several diesel locomotives, including three British Rail Class 08 shunters.

==== Steam ====
- Sentinel 4wVBT works no. 6515/GWR No. 12 "Isebrook", privately owned

==== Diesel ====
- British Rail Class 08 0-6-0DE 08 022 Lion, ex-Guinness Brewery, Park Royal, London
- British Rail Class 08 0-6-0DE 08 060 Unicorn, ex-Guinness Brewery, Park Royal, London
- British Rail Class 08 0-6-0DE 08 123 George Mason

==== Track inspection & maintenance vehicle ====
- Wickham trolley WD9045-8774

=== Carriage and wagon ===
The line has a varied collection of passenger carriages and freight wagons.
