= Steventon railway station =

Former railway station in England

Coordinates: 51.6215°N 1.3188°W

Steventon
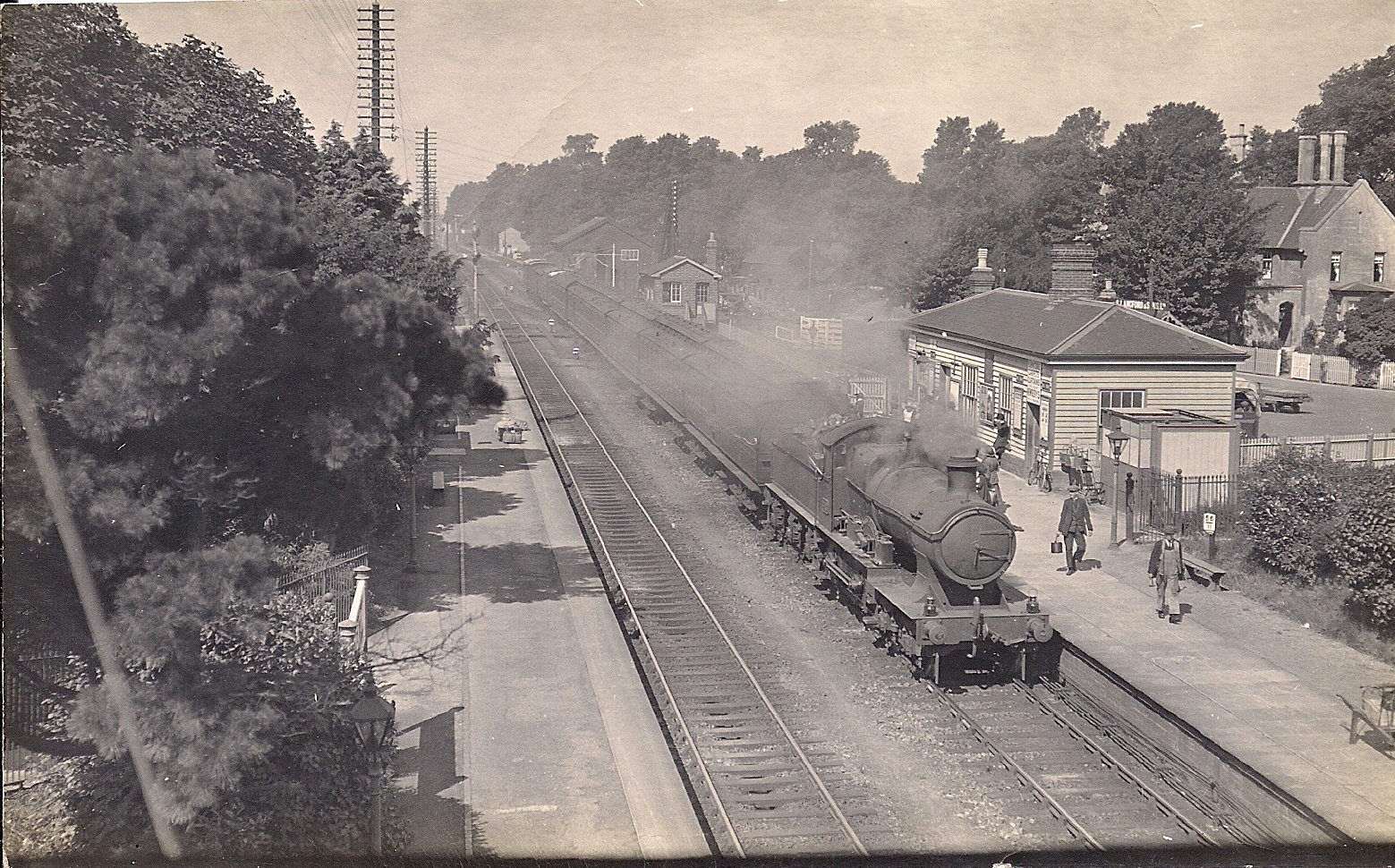

General information
- Location: Steventon, District of Vale of White Horse; England
- Grid reference: SU472916
- Platforms: 2

Other information
- Status: Disused

History
- Original company: Great Western Railway
- Pre-grouping: GWR
- Post-grouping: GWR; Western Region of British Railways

Key dates
- 1 June 1840: Opened
- 7 December 1964: Closed
Location

Steventon railway station was built when the Great Western Railway extended their main line from Reading to the village of Steventon, opening the line on 1 June 1840. Two months later, on 20 July, it was extended to Faringdon Road, and in December of that year, to Swindon.

== Station for Oxford ==
For four years stagecoaches transported passengers between Steventon and Oxford, until 1844 when a branch was built to the city from Didcot; despite this, mail trains from the West continued to call at Steventon, rather than Didcot, in order to drop off mails for Oxford – this practice did not end until March 1962.

On 7 December 1964 British Railways withdrew passenger services from Steventon and all other intermediate stations between Didcot and Swindon. The station was demolished soon after closure and there is no evidence remaining, except for a house used briefly as the company headquarters of the Great Western Railway which still stands on the "up" (north) side of the line (see next section).

== Headquarters of the GWR ==
Steventon was briefly the headquarters of the GWR: in October 1841, the Board decided to merge the previously-separate London and Bristol committees. Steventon was chosen as a suitable new location because it was close to the half-way point of the line (56 miles 22 chains from the old station at Paddington, 61 miles 71 chains from the old station at Bristol). A building for this purpose was erected: Brook House (now Grade II listed), reputedly designed by the Engineer of the GWR, Isambard Kingdom Brunel in the Jacobean style, but modified by the Resident Engineer for the Reading/Swindon section of the line, J.H. Gandell (and subsequently built by him as contractor, after he resigned his post as Resident Engineer), this building still survives on the north side of the line, set back slightly from the site of the station platforms. After a delay of several months, during which the accommodation was made ready, the weekly board meetings were held at Steventon from 21 July 1842 until 5 January 1843, when the permanent headquarters was established at Paddington.

In 1966, a Brunel-designed building at Steventon station, described as "An imposing stone-built residence ... comprising 3 Reception, 4 Bedrooms, etc.", was placed on sale, and "offers in the region of £4,750" were invited.

== Accidents and incidents ==
- On 21 January 1962, 68xx locomotive 6800 Arlington Grange was hauling a freight train that overran signals and was derailed.

== Route ==
Preceding station	Historical railways	Following station
Didcot; Line and station open	British Rail; Western Region; Great Western Main Line	Wantage Road; Line open, station closed
