= Didcot Parkway railway station =

Railway station in Oxfordshire, England

Didcot Parkway
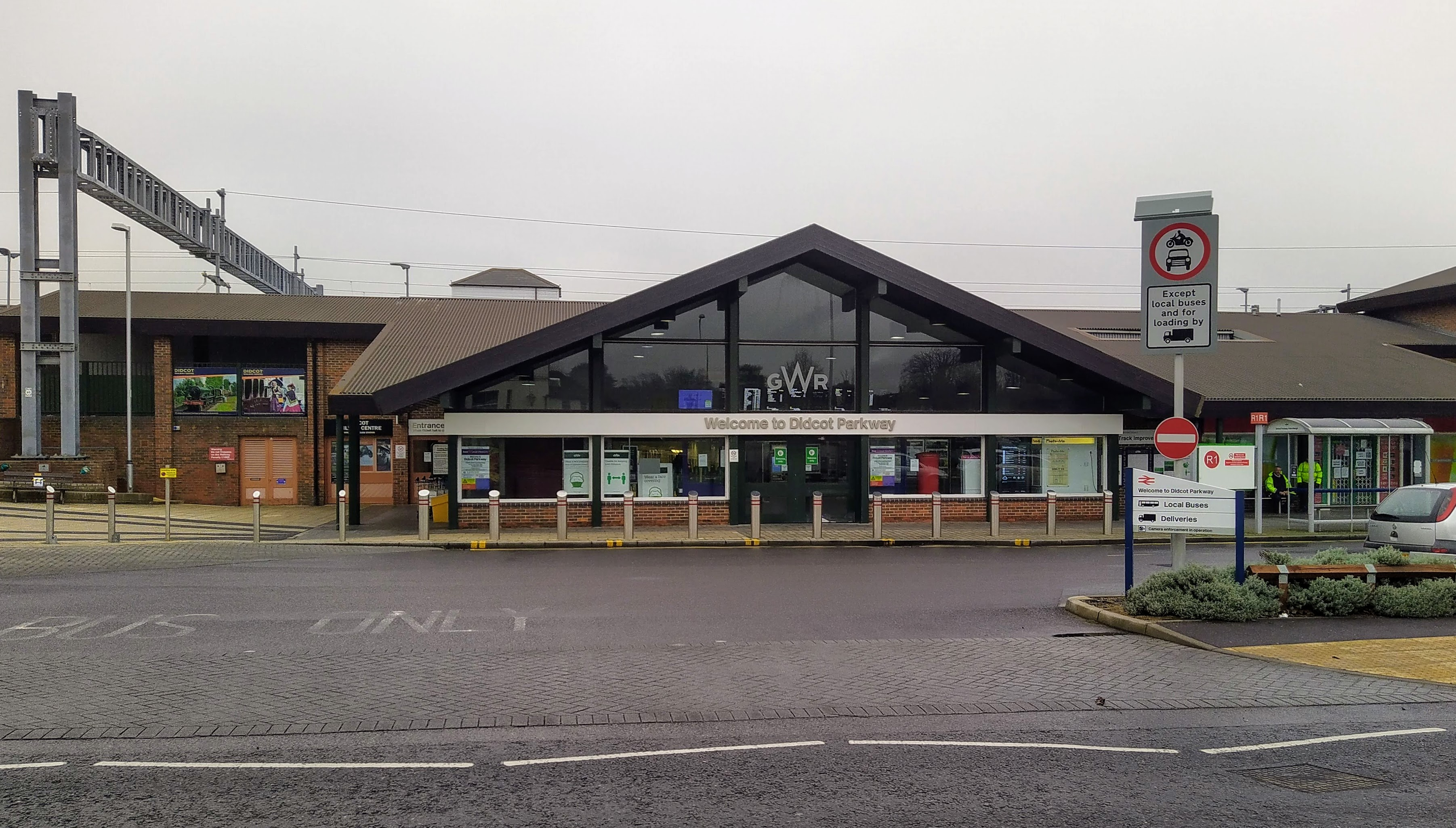
- The front of Didcot Parkway station in November 2020.

General information
- Location: Didcot, District of South Oxfordshire; England
- Coordinates: 51.61197°N 1.24348°W
- Grid reference: SU525905
- Manager: Great Western Railway
- Platforms: 5

Other information
- Station code: DID
- Classification: DfT category B

History
- Original company: Great Western Railway
- Pre-grouping: Great Western Railway
- Post-grouping: Great Western Railway

Key dates
- 1844: Opened
- 1962: Line to Newbury closed to passengers
- 1985: Renamed Didcot Parkway

Passengers
- 2021/22: ▲2.024 million
- Interchange: ▲0.361 million
- 2022/23: ▲2.330 million
- Interchange: ▲0.546 million
- 2023/24: ▲2.546 million
- Interchange: ▼0.545 million
- 2024/25: ▲2.884 million
- Interchange: ▲0.670 million
- 2025/26: ▲3.181 million
- Interchange: ▲0.695 million
Location
Notes
- Passenger statistics from the Office of Rail and Road

Didcot Parkway is a railway station serving Didcot, a town in Oxfordshire, England. The station was opened as Didcot on 12 June 1844 and was renamed Didcot Parkway on 29 July 1985 by British Rail, to reflect its role as a park and ride railhead. It is 53 miles 10 chains (53.13 mi; 85.5 km) down the line from London Paddington and is situated between Cholsey to the east and Swindon to the west.

The station is a stop on local services operated by Great Western Railway between Reading and Oxford, and by main line services from Paddington to the south-west of England and south Wales.

Just to the north of the station is the Didcot Railway Centre, which is accessed through the station. The centre is a comprehensive exhibition of original Great Western Railway rolling stock, with demonstration running tracks and including a reconstructed station named Didcot Halt.

== History ==
The railway has run through Didcot since 1 June 1840, when the Great Western Railway extended its main line from Reading to Steventon. During this period, a stagecoach transported passengers to Oxford from Steventon. A few weeks later, the line was extended to Faringdon Road station near West Challow, and eventually to Bristol Temple Meads. On 12 June 1844, the line from Didcot to Oxford was opened and Didcot station was opened at the junction. The original intended route would have taken a line from Steventon to Oxford via Abingdon, but Abingdon's townspeople objected to this idea. Otherwise, it is unlikely that Didcot would have evolved into the town it is today, as its initial growth was prompted by the coming of the railway.

The Didcot, Newbury and Southampton Railway (DN&S) linked the town with Newbury, carrying services to Southampton Terminus via Highclere, Winchester and Eastleigh. In its latter years, it was reduced to a rural backwater before its closure just before the Beeching cuts. The DN&S was closed to passengers on 10 September 1962 and to freight in 1967. At the eastern end of Platform 1, there is a raised section of the east car park, which used to be the bay platform for the DN&S line.

On 7 December 1964, local passenger services between Didcot and Swindon were withdrawn; the stations at Steventon, Wantage Road, Challow, Uffington, Shrivenham and Stratton Park were closed.

The station was formerly the junction for the Great Western Railway's line to Birkenhead Woodside, via Birmingham Snow Hill. The majority of express services between London and Birkenhead via this route ceased to operate via Reading and Didcot in 1910 with the opening of the Great Western and Great Central Joint line, as well as the Bicester cut-off. This new route was 18 1/2 miles shorter and, with the electrification of the West Coast Main Line, these express services ceased to run in 1967; New Street became the favoured station in central Birmingham.

In 1985, a new main building for the station was built along with a new 600-space car park on the site of the former provender store to the west of the station for Park and Ride use. These were opened on 29 July 1985 by David Mitchell MP, Parliamentary Under Secretary of State for Transport, and on that date the station was renamed Didcot Parkway.

In 2018, a multi-storey car park was opened, costing £20 million and increasing the number of spaces by 65% to 1800. The car park also has a sheltered footbridge.

In 2021, a new cycle storage hub was constructed, providing 600 covered spaces, LED lighting, CCTV cameras and a bike repair station. The project cost £1m, and was completed by a partnership of GWR, DfT and Network Rail.

Didcot Parkway was served by some CrossCountry services until 2003, when Virgin CrossCountry ceased to call at the station, with all services using the Didcot East curve to and from the Oxford line. As at December 2018, one late night CrossCountry service from Reading to Birmingham New Street passed through Didcot Parkway to allow drivers to retain route knowledge. Passenger services on the West Curve ceased for a time after Thames Trains' Oxford to Bristol Temple Meads service was withdrawn in 2003 but has been reinstated on Saturdays in 2024.

=== Accidents and incidents ===
- On 13 February 1861, a passenger service ran into the rear of a freight train at Didcot Junction. The guard of the freight train had failed to adequately protect the rear of his train.
- On 26 September 1873, a freight train was derailed whilst being shunted to allow a passenger train to pass.
- On 6 January 1932, a milk train and a freight train collided at Didcot East. The locomotive of the milk train, GWR 2800 Class 2-8-0 no. 2808, was derailed and six tankers were slightly damaged. Ten wagons of the freight were wrecked and seventeen more were damaged. The milk train had overrun a danger signal.
- On 14 August 1964, LMS Stanier Class 8F locomotive 48734 collided with a train of tank wagons at Didcot North Junction. Eleven of them were derailed and caught fire. The locomotive was severely damaged by the fire and was consequently scrapped.
- On 1 January 1966, a freight train was derailed.
- On 3 February 2007, a passenger train caught fire. All 400 passengers were evacuated.
- On 31 May 2018, the station was evacuated after heavy flooding.

=== Stationmasters ===
- John Peach 1860 - 1865 (formerly station master at Hungerford, afterwards station master at Reading)
- George Bland 1868 - 1872
- Henry Maggs 1872 - 1878 (formerly station master at Dorchester West, afterwards station master at Newton Abbot)
- Henry Larkcom/Larkam 1878 - 1881 (formerly station master at Lydney, afterwards station master at Reading)
- Charles William Noble 1881 - 1882 (formerly station master at Stourbridge, afterwards station master at Birmingham)
- H.C. Evans ca. 1885 - 1908
- J. Short 1908 - 1912 (afterwards station master at Banbury)
- Thomas Frederick Edwin Jakeman 1916 - 1917 (afterwards station master at Dorchester West)
- Arthur Meddows Taylor ca 1928 - 1930 (formerly station master at Stroud, afterwards station master at Swindon)
- T.G. Curnow 1930 - ca. 1941
- William Ferguson Brown 1950 - 1956 (afterwards station master at Reading)
- R. Hyatt ca. 1960

== Layout ==
=== Platforms ===
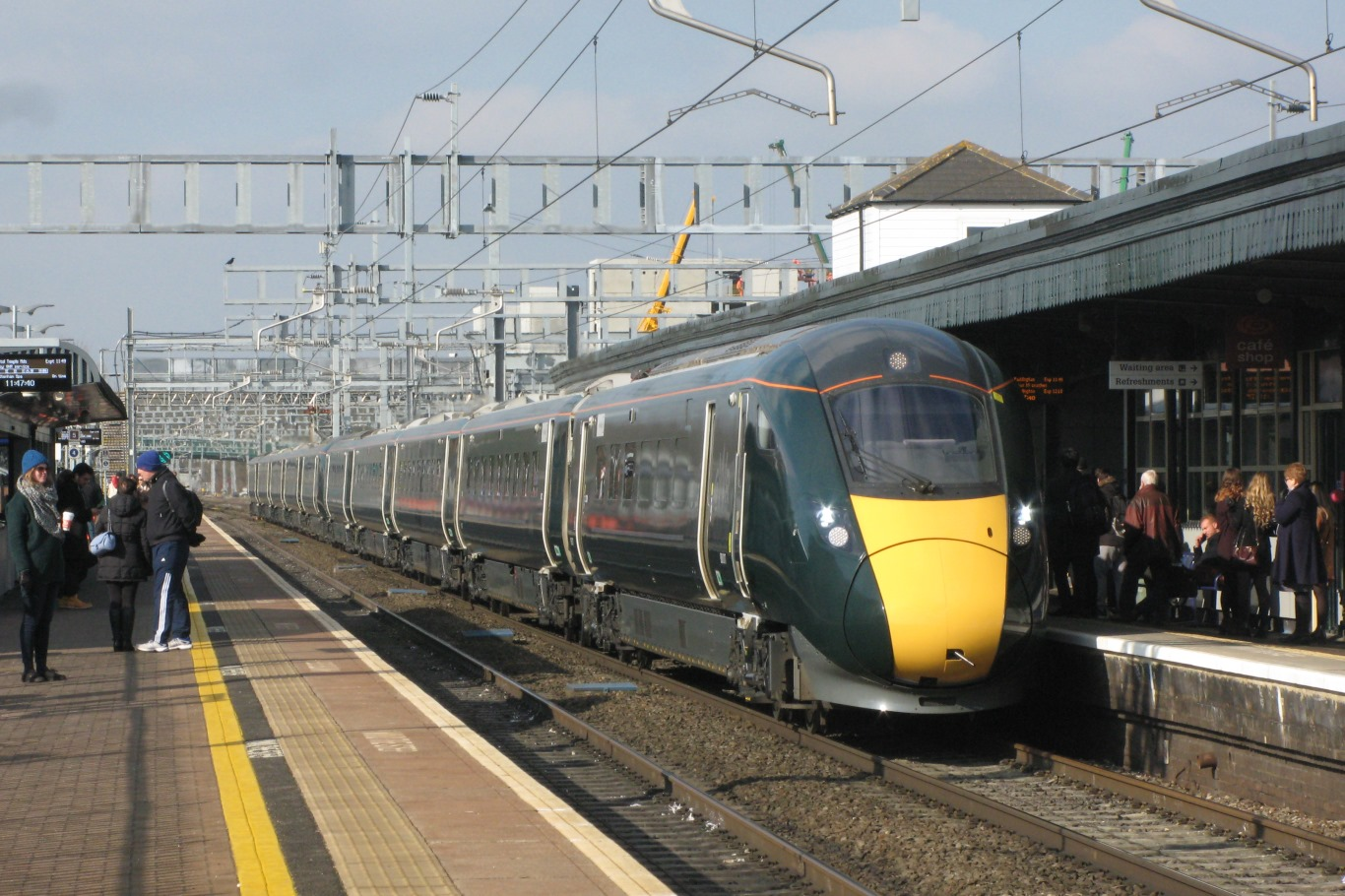
A GWR Class 800 from Swansea arriving on platform 2

The station is located just to the north of the town centre in Didcot. It can only be accessed by car from Station Road itself on the south side of the railway, although passengers may park in Foxhall Road long-stay car park, situated on Basil Hill Road, and cross a footbridge to the station. The station entrance is at road level; platforms 2-5 may be accessed by lifts, while platform 1 may be accessed from the ramp to the left of the station building near the taxi rank.

There are five platforms:

- Platform 1: Down (westbound) express services to Bristol Temple Meads, Cheltenham Spa, Cardiff Central and Swansea, limited services to Weston-super-Mare, Exeter St Davids and Carmarthen
- Platform 2: Up (eastbound) express services to London Paddington
- Platform 3: Down (northbound) local services to Oxford, Hereford and Banbury
- Platform 4: Up local services to Reading and London Paddington
- Platform 5: Down (northbound) local services to Oxford, Banbury and Moreton-in-Marsh.

=== Junctions and yards ===
Didcot is a junction between the Great Western Main Line (GWML) and the route to Oxford and the Midlands. A marshalling yard is opposite platform 5 and another was once provided at Moreton, a little to the east. Moreton is still a junction, allowing trains to pass between the main lines on the south, and the relief and Oxford lines on the north. An avoiding line runs from Didcot East Junction, behind the marshalling yard and the Didcot Railway Centre, allowing trains to Oxford to run through without blocking the station platforms. There also used to be another line at the East Junction which led to Newbury on the former DN&S railway. The track was lifted in 1967.

The junction at the west end of the station which is accessible from platforms 3, 4 and 5 (Oxford-bound) is known as Chester Line Junction.

West of the station is Foxhall Junction, which allows freight trains from Oxford to travel towards Swindon. Immediately beyond this, two goods lines diverge on the north side of the line. The first served a loop for Merry-go-round trains that used to deliver coal to Didcot Power Station. The second serves the Milton Freight Terminal, though this line is not in regular use. Beyond this, the four main and relief lines merge into three at Foxhall Junction and after a small loop just before Steventon, the four lines pass under the A34 and become two lines as far as the old station at Wantage Road.

== Infrastructure ==
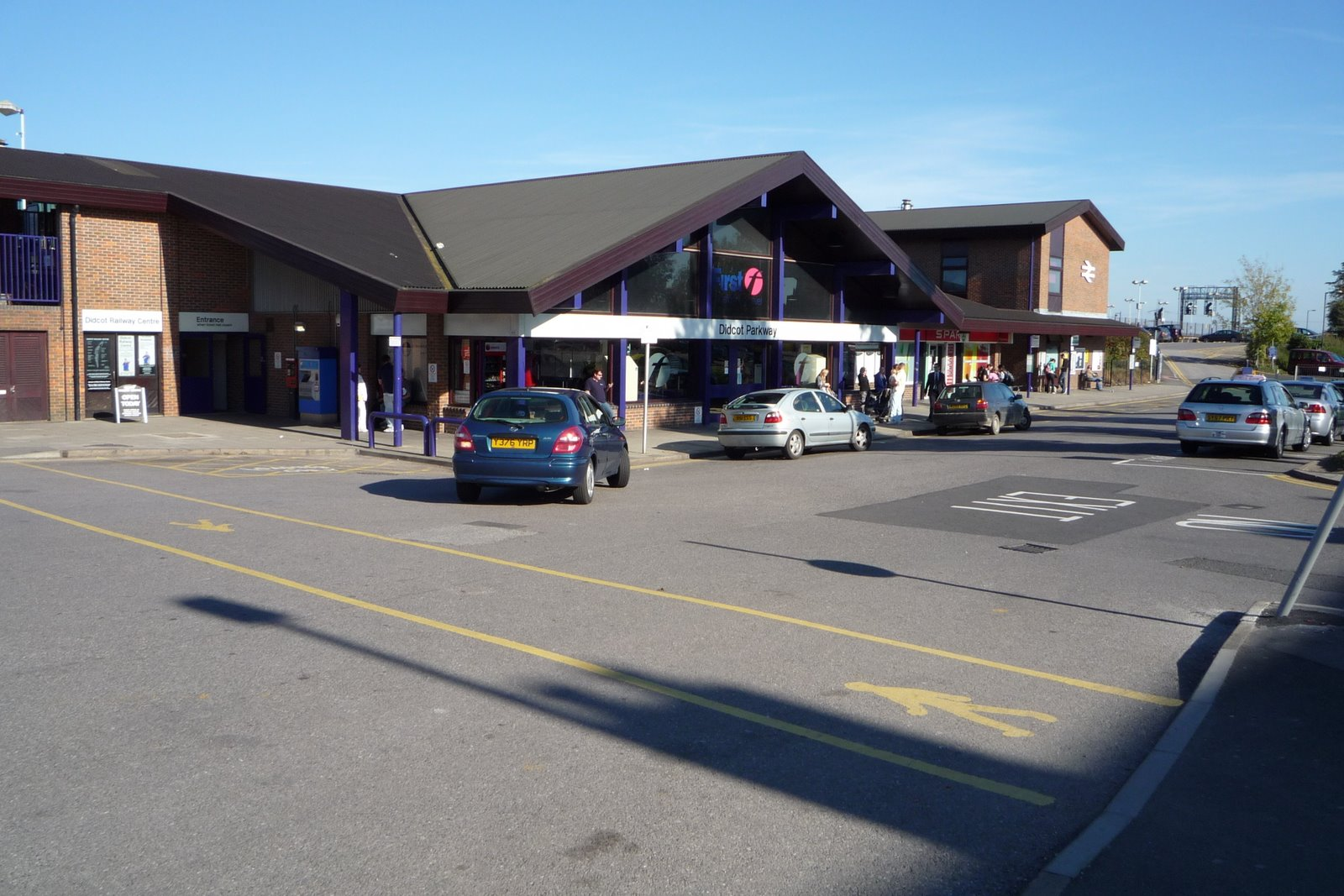
The station frontage in 2008, before improvement works began

=== Improvement programme in 2012 ===
An improvement programme for the forecourt of the station began in September 2012 and ran for two years.

Key features include:

- Larger taxi rank with covered waiting area
- Dedicated drop-off and pick-up area
- Short-stay waiting bays
- Disabled parking with step-free access
- Secure cycle parking and motorcycle parking
- Pedestrian piazza with seating and a glazed atrium and walkways
- Extra bus stops with electronic real-time information
- An improved East car park
- Better security with CCTV and new lighting
- New drainage to alleviate flooding
- Completion of a cycle route serving the station.

=== Electrification ===
As part of the 21st-century modernisation of the Great Western Main Line, the line was electrified to just west of Didcot Parkway in January 2018; it was extended west to Swindon in November 2018. It was originally proposed that the Oxford line also be electrified; however, cost overruns resulted in this being deferred. As a result, Didcot Parkway has seen an increase in the number of terminating services with Class 387 electric multiple units connecting at Didcot with Classes 165 and 166 diesel multiple units.

== Services ==
Didcot is a major junction, with regular Great Western Railway services on the following routes:

- London Paddington to Bristol Temple Meads or Cardiff Central, via Swindon, Chippenham and Bath Spa
- London Paddington to Cheltenham Spa, via Swindon and Gloucester
- London Paddington to Great Malvern, via Oxford, Evesham and Worcester Shrub Hill
- London Paddington to Didcot Parkway
- Didcot Parkway to Oxford or Banbury.

A few trains, generally in the early mornings on weekdays and Sunday services, call at Didcot for the Cotswold Line to Hereford. Infrequently, trains to Weston-super-Mare and further south-west call at this station.

Preceding station	National Rail	Following station
Reading	Great Western Railway Cotswold Line	Oxford
Reading	Great Western Railway Great Western Main Line Fast Services	Swindon
Cholsey	Great Western Railway Great Western Main Line Stopping Services	Terminus
Terminus	Great Western Railway Cherwell Valley Line	Appleford
	Historical railways	
Moulsford Line open, station closed	Great Western Railway Great Western Main Line	Steventon Line open, station closed
Moulsford Line open, station closed	Great Western Railway Cherwell Valley Line	Appleford Line and station open
	Disused railways	
Terminus	Great Western Railway Didcot, Newbury and Southampton Railway	Upton and Blewbury Line and station closed

== See also ==
- List of Parkway railway stations
