= Wallingford Grammar School =

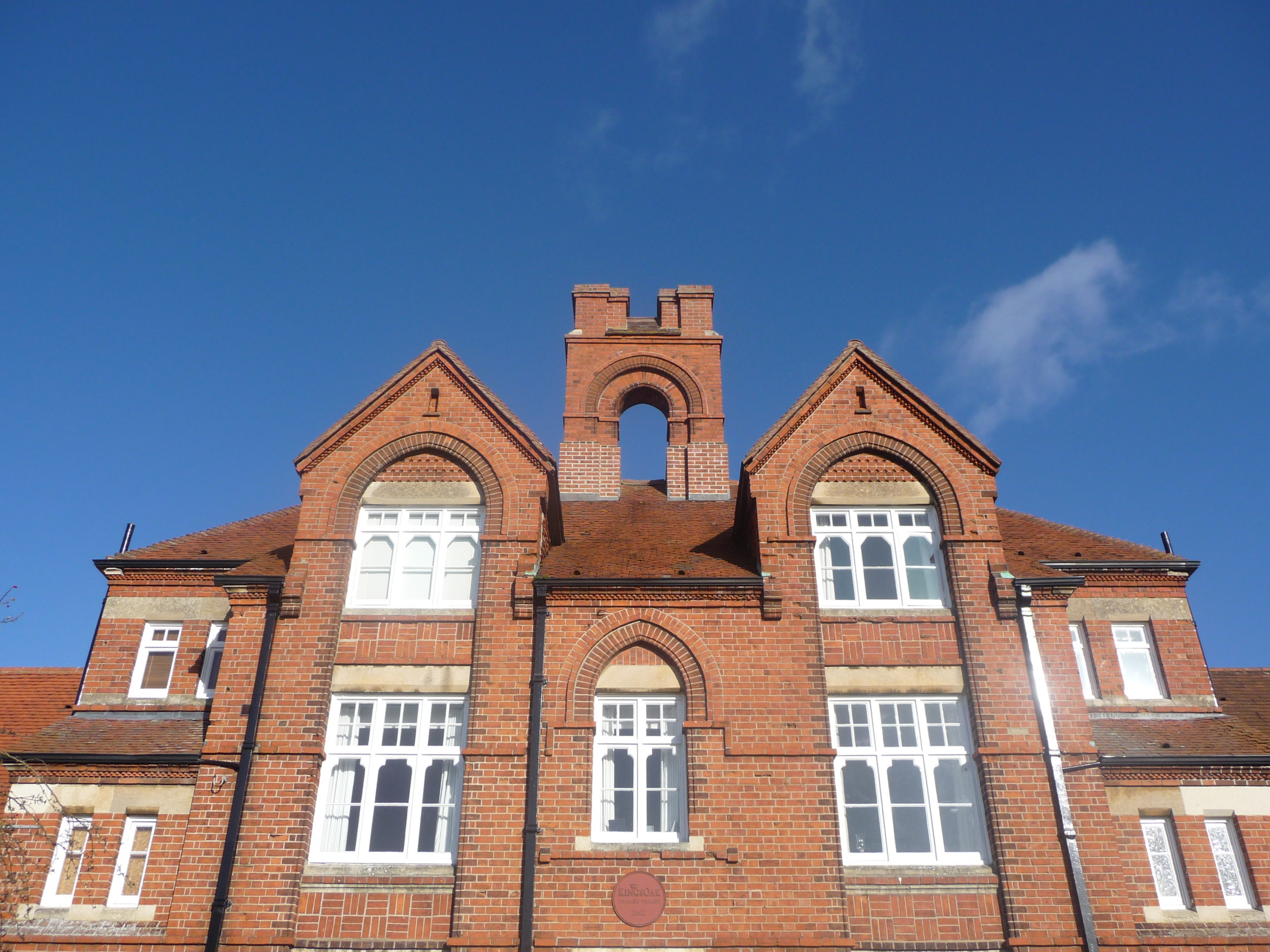

Location
- Station Road; Wallingford, Oxfordshire; England
- Coordinates: 51.60153°N 1.12979°W

Information
- Type: Grammar school
- Established: 1877
- Founder: Walter Bigg / Sidney R. Stephenson
- Closed: 1973
- Local authority: Oxfordshire
- Gender: Co-educational
- Age: 11 to 18
- Status: Defunct. Amalgamated with Blackstone Secondary Modern to become Wallingford School in 1973. School building converted to housing in 1998

Wallingford Grammar School was a grammar school in the town of Wallingford, Oxfordshire (formerly Berkshire), England, succeeded by Wallingford School when comprehensive education was introduced in 1973.

== History ==
When Walter Bigg, thought to have been Innkeeper of St Giles in the Fields, a Sheriff of London, Master of the Worshipful Company of Merchant Taylors, and MP for Wallingford, died in 1659, he left £10 for the education of six poor boys at a school in Wallingford. The Wallingford Corporation Minute Book shows that the school was active in 1672. The school buildings were at St John's Green from 1717 to 1780, through a lease bought with Bigg's endowment. When the lease ended the school transferred to the headmaster's house, and later the upper room in the Town Hall was used a schoolroom until 1863, when the school briefly closed.

=== School building ===
The school was revived under the Endowed Schools Act of 1872, and Wallingford School, which still benefits from the Bigg Charity was formally established when a grammar school building was built on the corner of St George's Road and Station Road in 1877 by Sidney Roberts Stevenson. The boys’ and girls’ schools were amalgamated onto one site in 1904.

=== Boys' school ===
In 1958 the girls were moved to Didcot Girls' Grammar School, the forerunner of Didcot Girls' School. In 1958, Blackstone Secondary Modern was built near Blackstone Road on St George's Road. It was also known as Wallingford County Grammar School. It had a rowing team.

=== Dissolution ===
With the onset of comprehensive education in 1973, Blackstone was used as the lower school (taking age 11–13) and the old grammar school was the upper school (taking older children). In 1998 the school was centralised at the old secondary modern site, and the old grammar school converted to apartments.

== Alumni ==
- Prof Malcolm Clarke, Senior Principal Scientific Officer of the Marine Biological Association of the United Kingdom 1978–87
- General Sir Frank King, Colonel Commandant 1974–79 of the Army Air Corps, and Director of Operations in Northern Ireland 1973–75
- Maj-Gen Norman Speller, Colonel Commandant of the Royal Army Ordnance Corps (RAOC) 1978–83
- Prof Michael Sheringham, Marshal Foch Professor of French Literature since 2004 at the University of Oxford, and President 2002–04 of the Society for French Studies
- Ann Packer, Olympic gold medallist, 800 metres 1964.

== See also ==
- List of English and Welsh endowed schools (19th century)
