= A4130 road =

Road in England

Coordinates: 51.59365°N 1.06593°W

A4130

Location
- Country: United Kingdom
- Constituent country: England

Road network
- Roads in the United Kingdom; Motorways; A and B road zones

The A4130 is a British A road which runs from a junction with the A404 at Burchetts Green (Maidenhead), Berkshire to the A417 at Rowstock in Oxfordshire. It passes through Henley-on-Thames, and Nettlebed, and bypasses Wallingford and Didcot.

== History ==
=== Pre-1970s ===
Until the 1970s the road ended at a junction with the A417 at Harwell. When the A34 was upgraded in the 1970s, the A4130 was extended north from Rowstock along the old line of the A34 to an interchange with the new A34 at Milton Heights, near Milton Park. A few years later, a new link road was built from Didcot to Milton Heights and became the A4130. The old route between Didcot and Harwell was then downgraded to become the B4493.

=== 1970s – 1990s ===
Until 1990 the road started at a junction with the A423 1.2 miles (1.9 km) west of Nuffield, and the 2.5-mile (4.0 km) stretch between that point and Crowmarsh Gifford was designated a trunk road. The road between Burchetts Green (Maidenhead) and Nuffield was part of the A423 trunk road from Maidenhead (via Oxford) to Coventry. When the M40 motorway was opened, the A423 and the A4130 both lost trunk road status because the route from Maidenhead to the Coventry was transferred onto the M40. That part of the A423 was renumbered A4130.

=== Wallingford Bypass ===
In 1993 the Wallingford Bypass was opened, and the A4130 was diverted to follow the new road, crossing the River Thames by the new Winterbrook Bridge instead of Wallingford Bridge.
