= Winterbrook =

Settlement in Oxfordshire, England

Coordinates: 51.58°N 01.13°W

Winterbrook is a small settlement in the English county of Oxfordshire, which adjoins the south end of Wallingford and sits on the west bank of the Thames. It is separated from Wallingford by Bradford's Brook. In 1974 it was transferred from Berkshire. Although having been part of the adjacent parish of Cholsey for centuries, its proximity to Wallingford resulted in its being absorbed into that town for administrative purposes in 2015. This change was effected despite the strenuous and long-term objections of the residents. It is now part of the Wallingford ward of South Oxfordshire District Council. It remains in the Church of England parish of St Mary the Virgin, North Stoke.

Winterbrook appears in records from the time of King Henry III. It is connected to the east bank by Winterbrook Bridge. The common lands in Winterbrook were enclosed in 1851. Winterbrook House is a Grade II listed 17th-century house. Its most famous resident was the novelist, Agatha Christie, who lived at Winterbrook House and died there in 1976. Winterbrook Lodge and Winterbrook Close are both Grade II listed early 19th-century houses. Other major buildings include the Waterside Court Care Home and the Winterbrook Nursing Home. As of 2009, Winterbrook residents were campaigning against its possible selection as the preferred option for 850 new houses as part of the South Oxfordshire Core Strategy as well as a preemptive planning application by Wates Homes Ltd (part of Wates Group) for 106 dwellings. Planning permission was refused.
