= Wallingford Regatta =

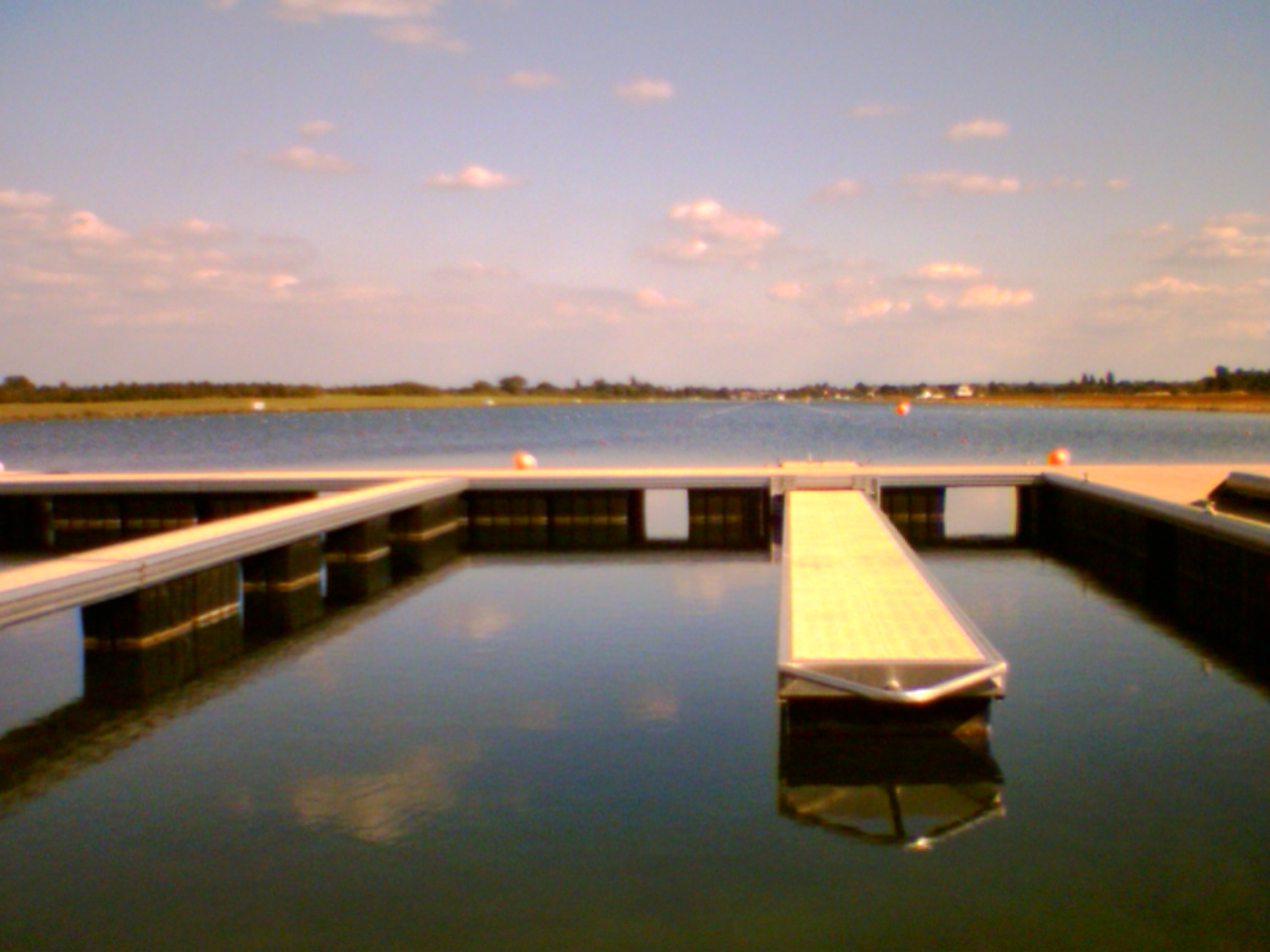
Dorney Lake, location of Wallingford Regatta

Wallingford Regatta is a rowing regatta which takes place on Dorney Lake, Buckinghamshire near Eton next to the River Thames in southern England. It attracts crews from schools, clubs and universities from around the United Kingdom.

The regatta was formerly "Wallingford Skiff Regatta" the only organised boating in 1949 on the Wallingford stretch of the Thames above Cleeve Lock. It had taken place every year in peacetime since the late 1890s and there is evidence that it existed as early as 1861. In 1949 the regatta committee founded Wallingford Rowing Club which purchased some old boats and, with mostly novice rowers, started competing in other regattas. The regatta was developed as a conventional regatta although it still awards the Wallingford Skiff Regatta Cup.

The regatta was held on the same reach at Wallingford for most of its existence, but river conditions caused problems and there was pressure for larger facilities. In 2005 a local pub regatta on the same reach was gate-crashed by a BBC programme creating a remake of Three Men in a Boat. Wallingford Regatta itself had moved to its current course on Dorney Lake in 2001.

== See also ==
- Rowing on the River Thames
