= Wallingford, Oxfordshire =

Town in Oxfordshire, England

Coordinates: 51°35′56″N 1°07′30″W

Wallingford
- Market town and civil parish
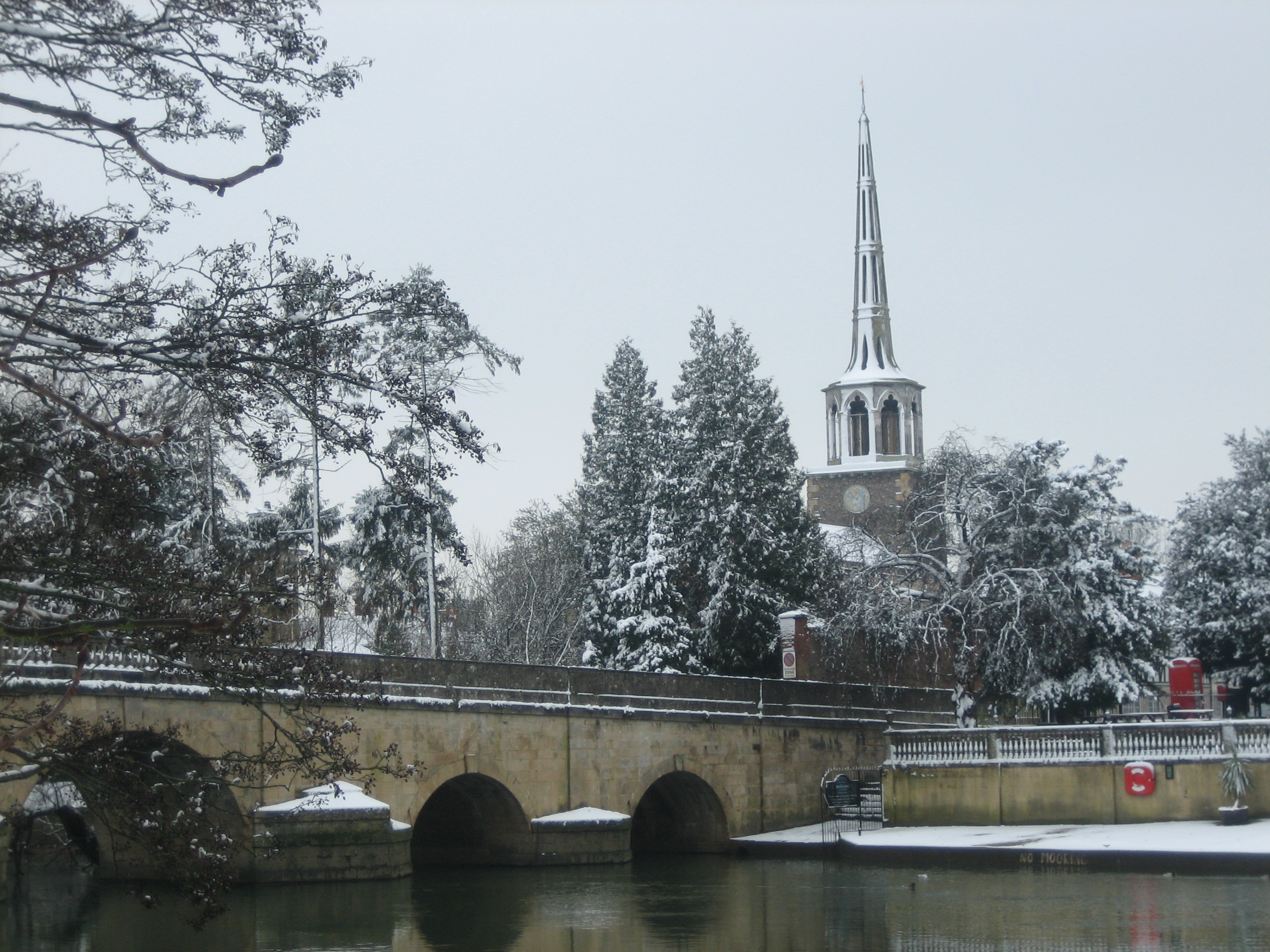
- Wallingford Bridge with St Peter's Church

- Wallingford Town Council coat of arms

- Location within Oxfordshire
- Area: 3.10 sq mi (8.0 km^{2})
- Population: 11,600
  - Density: 3,742/sq mi (1,445/km^{2})
- OS grid reference: SU6089
  - London: 44 miles (71 km)
- Civil parish: Wallingford
- District: South Oxfordshire
- Shire county: Oxfordshire
- Region: South East
- Country: England
- Sovereign state: United Kingdom
- Post town: Wallingford
- Postcode district: OX10
- Dialling code: 01491
- Police: Thames Valley
- Fire: Oxfordshire
- Ambulance: South Central
- UK Parliament: Didcot and Wantage
- Website: Wallingford Town Council

Wallingford (/ˈwɒlɪŋfərd/) is a market town and civil parish on the River Thames in South Oxfordshire, England, 12 miles (19 km) north of Reading, 13 miles (21 km) south of Oxford and 11 miles (18 km) north west of Henley-on-Thames. Although belonging to the historic county of Berkshire, it is within the ceremonial county of Oxfordshire for administrative purposes (since 1974) as a result of the Local Government Act 1972. The population was 11,600 at the 2011 census.

The town has played an important role in English history starting with the surrender of Stigand to William the Conqueror in 1066, which led to his taking the throne and the creation of Wallingford Castle. The castle and the town enjoyed royal status and flourished for much of the Middle Ages. The Treaty of Wallingford, which ended a civil war known as The Anarchy between King Stephen and Empress Matilda, was signed there. The town then entered a period of decline after the arrival of the Black Death and falling out of favour with the Tudor monarchs before being called on once again during the English Civil War. Wallingford held out as the last remaining Royalist stronghold in Berkshire before surrendering after a 16-week siege. Fearing that Wallingford Castle could be used in a future uprising, Oliver Cromwell ordered its destruction.

Since then Wallingford has become a market town and centre of local commerce. At the centre of the town is a market square with the war memorial and Wallingford Town Hall to the south, the Corn Exchange theatre to the east and numerous shops around the edges. Off the square there are alleyways and streets with more shops and a number of historic inns. Although it was a small town, Wallingford once had 14 churches; now, there are three ancient churches within the Parish of St Mary-le-More and St Leonard, a modern Roman Catholic church, a Quaker Meeting House dating from 1724 and Baptist, Methodist and community churches.

== Etymology ==
The place-name first appears as Wælingford in a Saxon charter of 821, as Welingaford around 891 and as Walingeford in the Domesday Book of 1086. A number of etymologies have been proposed and the name has been the subject of debate for centuries.

Both William Camden and Samuel Lewis state that the modern English name ultimately derives from a preexisting Brythonic name for the site. Camden gives this name as "Gual Hen", with Lewis giving "Guallen", with sound changes meaning the word became "Walling" in Old English with the element "ford" being suffixed at a later time. If either derivation is correct, the modern English name would mean "ford at the old fortification". Eilert Ekwall and John Richard Green derive Wallingford as the ford of "Wealh's or Walhaz people", meaning "Ford of the Welsh people" (British speaking Celts).

== History ==
=== Early history ===
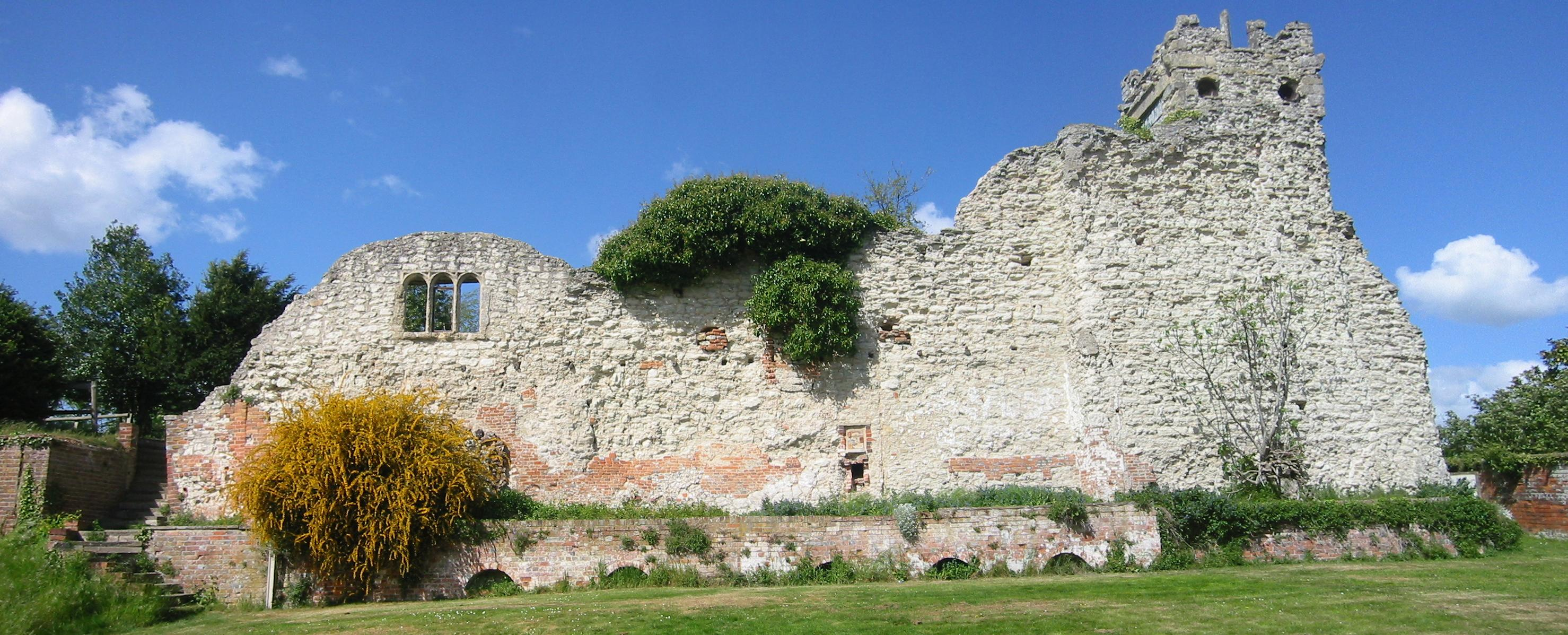
Ruins in the Wallingford Castle Gardens

Wallingford developed around an important crossing point of the River Thames. There is evidence of Roman activity in the area who have left traces of occupation, burials, roads, coins and pottery. The Anglo-Saxons built the first settlement. Wallingford has been fortified since the Anglo-Saxon period when it was an important fortified borough of Wessex with the right to mint royal coinage. It was enclosed with substantial earthworks by King Alfred the Great in the ninth century as part of a network of fortified towns known as burhs, or burghs, to protect Wessex against the Vikings. These defences can still be clearly discerned as a group of four roughly square areas around the centre of the town and are well-preserved. Wallingford became the chief town of Berkshire and the seat of the county's Ealdorman.

=== Medieval period ===
During the Norman Conquest in 1066, the Anglo-Saxon lord Wigod allowed William the Conqueror's invading armies into Wallingford to rest and to cross the Thames unopposed. It was in Wallingford that Stigand the Archbishopric of Canterbury surrendered and submitted to William, thereby all but ending opposition to William's ascent to the throne. From Wallingford, William with Stigand and his armies rode east to Berkhamsted, where he received the final surrender from Edgar and the rest of the English leadership before marching on London for his coronation on Christmas Day. At that time, the river at Wallingford was the lowest point at which the river could be forded. The town subsequently stood in high favour with the Normans as Wallingford Castle was built soon afterward on the orders of William, and became a key strategic centre controlling the Thames crossing and surrounding area. The Domesday Book of 1086 lists Wallingford as one of only 18 towns in the kingdom with a population of over 2,000 people.

==== Establishment of Wallingford Priory (1097) ====
Wallingford Priory, also known as Holy Trinity Priory, is believed to have stood on the site of the Bull Croft recreation ground off the High Street. This Benedictine priory was established on land granted to St Albans Abbey in 1097 by Henry I, and Geoffrey the Chamberlain gave the priory to St Albans Paul, 14th Abbot of St Albans, who sent some of his monks to establish a cell there. Wallingford Priory produced the mathematician Richard of Wallingford and the chronicler John of Wallingford.

==== The Anarchy and King John (12th century) ====
Wallingford provided refuge for the Empress Matilda's party during the civil war that began after her father Henry I's death. After the fall of Oxford Castle to Stephen in 1141, Matilda fled to Wallingford, according to some historic accounts in the snow under a moonlit sky. Wallingford Castle was besieged unsuccessfully a number of times, with the Treaty of Wallingford ending the conflict there in November 1153.

The town was granted a Royal Charter in 1155 by the new king, Henry II, being the second town in England to receive one.

During Prince John's unsuccessful revolt against his brother King Richard I whilst Richard was involved with the Third Crusade, John seized Wallingford Castle in 1189. The rebellion failed, and John was forced to return the castle to the king's administrators. King John reclaimed the castle after his inheriting the crown in 1199. John modernised, fortified and greatly enlarged the Castle and used it extensively during the First Barons' War.

==== Decline (13th–15th centuries) ====
The town declined in importance from the mid-13th century, when its size and population reduced. The town received a further blow when plague arrived in 1343. It severely damaged the town and its population; the number of churches declined from eleven (during the reign of King Henry II) to only four by the 15th century. The castle declined subsequently, much stone being removed to renovate Windsor Castle.

The road from London to Gloucestershire passed through Wallingford, and the town flourished as a trading centre throughout most of the Middle Ages. The road was diverted, and a bridge was constructed at Abingdon. The opening of Abingdon Bridge and loss of traffic that the road had brought caused the town to enter a steep economic decline.

==== Catherine of Valois and Owen Tudor (1422) ====
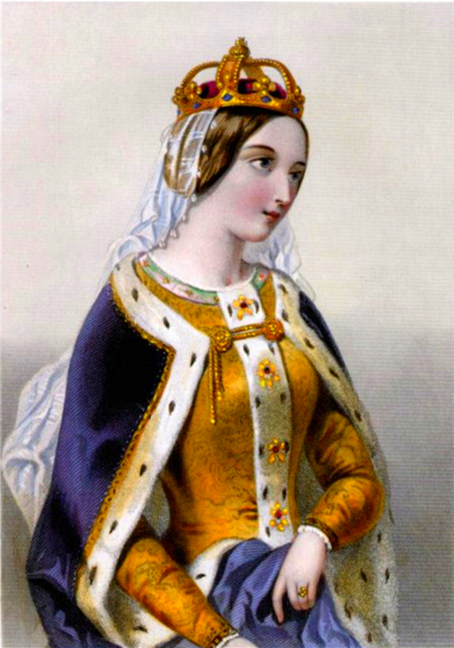
Catherine of Valois

In 1422 Wallingford and its castle was granted to Catherine of Valois, widowed Queen of Henry V. Catherine lived at Wallingford with her son Henry VI, who was tutored there. While she lived at Wallingford, Catherine met Owen Tudor, whom she later married in secret. Catherine and Owen's eldest son Edmund Tudor fathered Henry VII who defeated Richard III at Bosworth Field and founded the Tudor Dynasty.

=== The Tudor dynasty (1485–1603) ===
One of the last documented uses of Wallingford as a royal residence was during 1518. Letters between Cardinal Wolsey and his secretary Richard Pace discuss King Henry VIII's dissatisfaction with Wallingford and his desire to move on. The priory was dissolved in 1525 by Cardinal Wolsey, partly in order to fund the building of the Cardinal College in Oxford. Henry VIII separated the Honour of Wallingford, which included rights of control over the town and its castle, from the Duchy of Cornwall in 1540.

He combined it with the Honour of Ewelme, which included the rights over his existing residence and lands at Ewelme. Ewelme is two miles from Wallingford, so this was done to consolidate control in the area. In return Henry transferred as compensation several areas of Cornish property into the Duchy of Cornwall for Prince Edward. After taking control of Wallingford in 1540, Henry VIII did not favour choosing Wallingford Castle as an official residence. Instead, he opted to transfer materials from it to Windsor to enlarge & improve his own castle there. This practice of dismantling Wallingford Castle to improve Windsor Castle was continued in the reigns of Edward VI, Mary I, and Elizabeth I.

=== English Civil War and aftermath ===
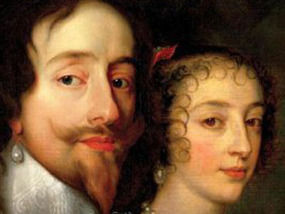
King Charles I and Queen Henrietta Maria

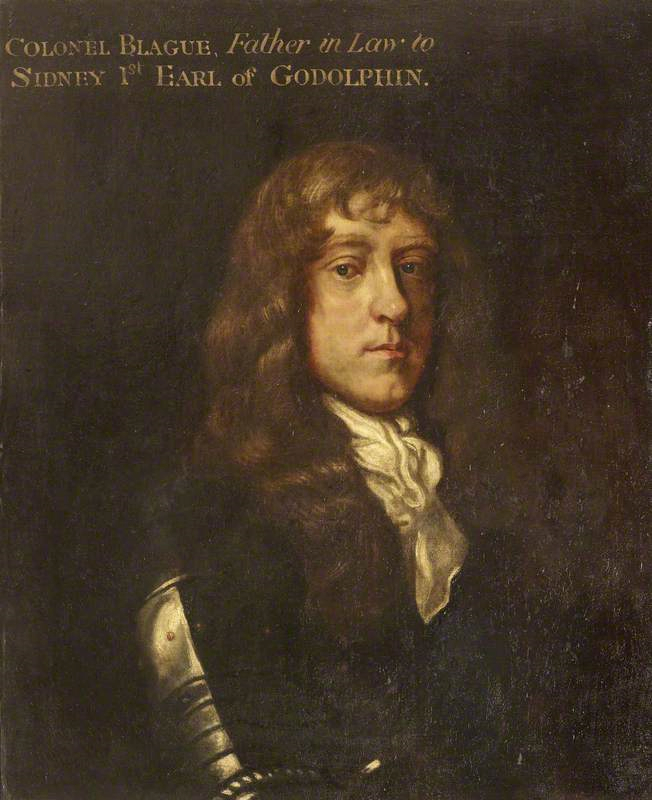
Colonel Thomas Blagge

Maintenance and repair of Wallingford Castle during the English Civil War was vital to the success of the Royalists' plans. The royal headquarters were in Oxford, which made the defence of Wallingford, which controlled the area to the south, especially strategically important. In August 1643 Colonel Blagge was granted warrants from the King and Prince Rupert to collect taxes from Reading and other local towns in order to proceed with the repairs. In April 1643 the king marched south from Wallingford in order to relieve Reading, which was besieged by the Earl of Essex. The Parliamentary army was 16,000 strong and laid siege to Reading using cannons. Reading was unable to hold out long enough for the King and Prince Rupert to arrive and break the siege. The town surrendered on 27 April 1643, with "the garrison joining the royal army and together they retreated through Wallingford back to Oxford".

In 1643 a group of Parliamentary commissioners came to Wallingford in search of an audience with the King. Blagge received them, with the encounter being recorded as "worrying". "He received them, 'not rudely, but with haughtiness enough,' sending a troop of horse to escort them as if they had been prisoners. High words followed; the commissioners feared they might have had their throats cut by the garrison and gladly took their leave of the 'proud governour." 4 October 1643 was the last time the king and queen visited the town together, although they did visit Abingdon, staying at Barton Lodge on 17 April 1644. It was also the last time that any British king and queen stayed at the castle together, owing to its destruction at the end of the war. By May 1644 the war had turned decidedly against the Royalists in Berkshire, and a failure of communications among the commanders left Abingdon open to occupation by the Parliamentarians. General Waller took the town and the garrison retreated to Wallingford.

After the Second Battle of Newbury on 27 October 1644, where neither side had gained a true victory, King Charles I retreated through Wallingford on his way to Oxford. Although his retreat went initially unchallenged, the next day at a meeting of the War Council it was resolved that Cromwell, Balfour and Sir Arthur Hesilrige were to be allowed to take cavalry to pursue the King. They were too late, and by the time they reached Wallingford, they found the Royalists had already advanced to Oxford, with the castle blocking their path. It was annoyance at missing an opportunity to capture the king that led to Cromwell forming his New Model Army.

==== Siege of Wallingford ====
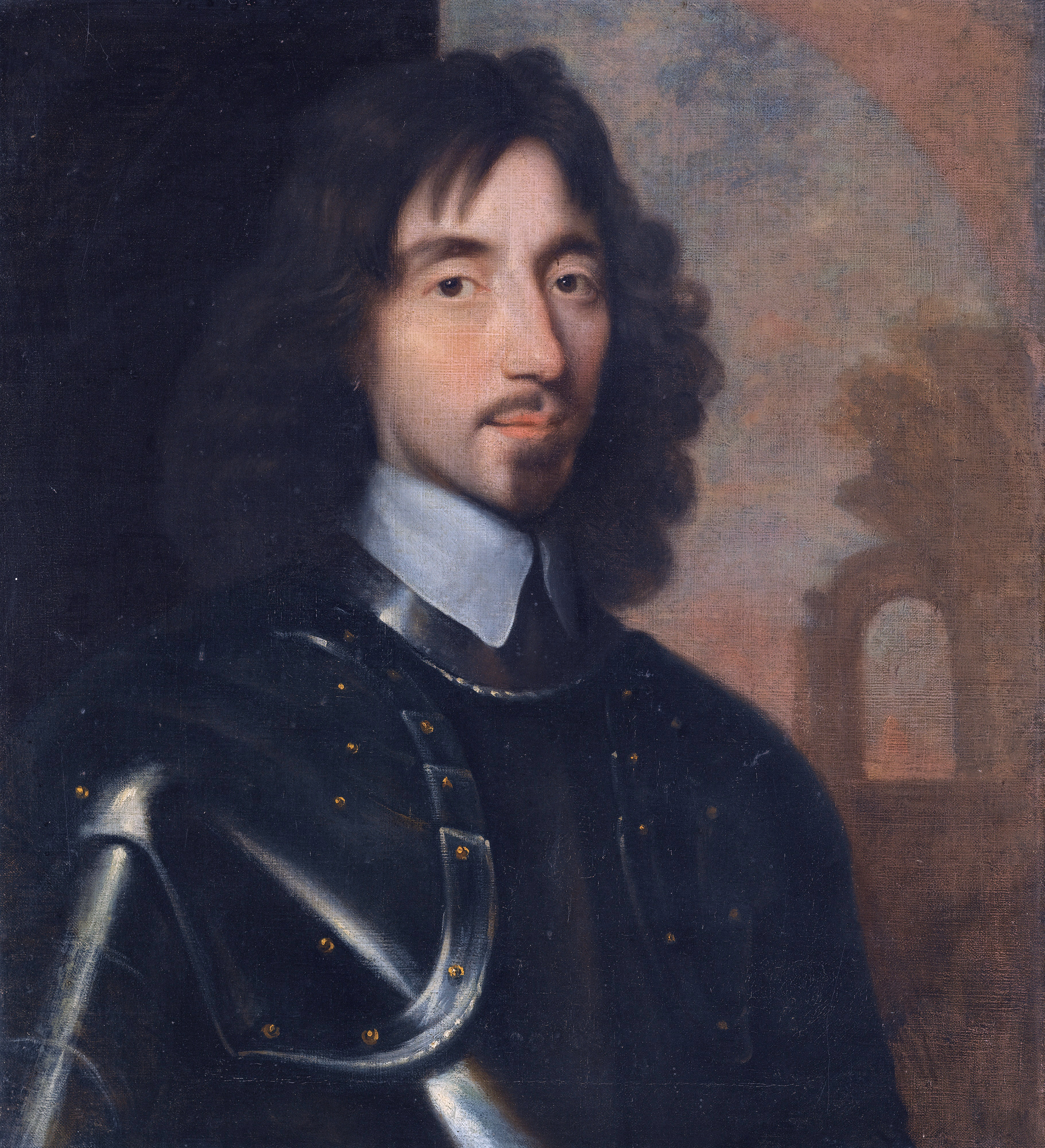
General Thomas Fairfax

The first assault on the town was led by Colonel Baxter, the governor of Reading in 1645. However, finding that the fortifications exceeded his expectations, he retreated quickly to Reading. By the end of 1645 the situation had worsened, with the king's defeat at the Battle of Naseby by General Fairfax. By this point Wallingford, Faringdon and Donnington were the only strongholds still loyal to the king in the county of Berkshire. The king held up at Oxford for the winter, with the intention of riding south to relieve and retake positions in Berkshire, but the failure of reinforcements to arrive from the west and the imminent threat of siege by General Fairfax forced him to flee north. The siege of Wallingford was begun on 4 May 1646 by General Fairfax; the Parliamentarians laid siege to Oxford on 11 May.

Oxford held out until 24 June, when the garrison of 3,000 men including the king's nephews, Prince Rupert and Prince Maurice, were marched out of the city with full honours. Now only Wallingford remained, its garrison faithfully holding the town and castle for the king under the leadership of Colonel Blagge. However, his position was now impossible to hold, with the town being blockaded on all sides. It was only a matter of time, but still Blagge held that he would not surrender without the king's order and even threatened to set fire to the town during a full assault.

A Parliamentary special council met and decided that the difficulty of any full assault would cause unacceptable losses. Waiting and trying to starve Blagge out would give the king time to build his forces. They were also very concerned that they were risking making a martyr of the town to the Royalist cause in Berkshire if the townspeople suffered too much, either in a prolonged siege or an assault. The council resolved to draw up preferential terms for Wallingford's surrender. Initially, Blagge refused even these with the same answer that he would need the king's consent to surrender the town. However, by July, with the king's surrender to the Scotch Army and Wallingford now being the only stronghold in Berkshire still loyal to the crown, he knew that there would be no relief or reinforcements.

The blockade had over time also been tightened, and with the prospect of desertion and mutiny from his starving soldiers, Blagge was forced to reopen negotiations. The terms of Blagge's surrender were drawn up on 22 July 1646. General Fairfax respected Blagge as a fellow soldier for his work in resurrecting the castle for the war, and for the manner in which he chose to hold for as long as possible instead of surrendering. Fairfax therefore still granted Blagge the original favourable terms of surrender he was offered, even though the situation had changed. The surrender stipulated that the town and its castle would be surrendered to General Fairfax on 29 July and that all of the town's arms, ordinance and provisions of war would be handed over to Fairfax.

Blagge and his garrison would then be allowed to march out of the town with full honours, and allowed to leave with their horses, arms and baggage. They would then be permitted to march ten miles out of the town before disbanding. Blagge was, however, forced in the end to surrender the castle to General Fairfax early on the 27th after a mutiny broke out within the garrison. Fairfax sent a regiment into the town to restore order, and the garrison's exit was made unimpeded. Only two castles now remained supporting the royalist cause, Raglan and Pendennis, and they both fell by August. A new governor, Evelyn, was installed, although he petitioned for the immediate destruction of the castle. Parliament instead decided to use it for the imprisonment of Presbyterian prisoners after the Prides Purge.

==== Slighting of the castle ====
Continued turmoil, unrest in the country and a fear that the residents of Wallingford were still loyal to the crown caused Oliver Cromwell to fear that Wallingford Castle could again be fortified against him in a future uprising. On 17 November 1652, the Council of State decided that Wallingford Castle should be "forthwith demolished and the workes thereto belonging effectually slighted." Materials from the castle were used again for improvement works at Windsor Castle and for the repair and improvement of the church of St Mary-le-More.

=== Georgian period ===
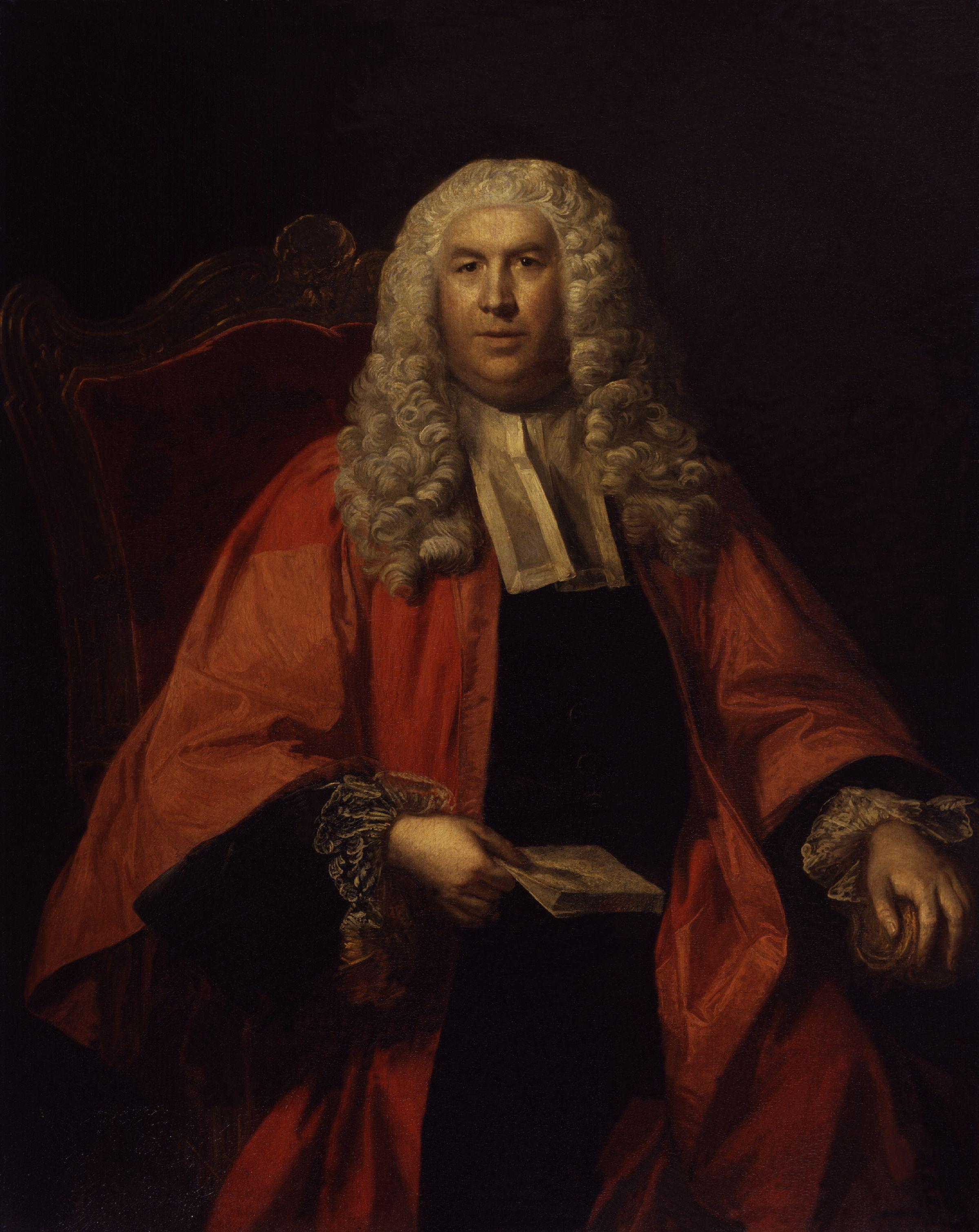
Sir William Blackstone

Sir William Blackstone, a famous English jurist, judge and Tory politician lived in Wallingford and held the office of Recorder of the town. The Blackstone family owned an estate in and around Wallingford, and William, upon inheriting it, built a house called Castle Priory to live in. William is most noted for writing the Commentaries on the Laws of England; these are noted for their influence on the American Constitution. Sir William died in Wallingford in 1780 and is buried in St Peter's Church.

By the end of the 18th century, the Parliamentary Borough of Wallingford was known as being one of the worst rotten boroughs. During the Reform Act 1832, the constituency borders were increased geographically, and the number of MPs cut from two to one.

=== 20th and 21st centuries ===
On 9 September 1944 a Halifax bomber of No. 426 Squadron RCAF, returning from an abandoned raid over the French port of Le Havre while still carrying a full bomb load, caught fire over Wallingford after its port outer engine exploded. Ordering most of his crew to bail out, the pilot, 23-year-old Flying Officer John Archibald Wilding, and his flight engineer, 22-year-old Sergeant John Francis Andrew, remained at the controls in order to steer the plane away from the town, crashing into the fields at Newnham Murren and thus preventing the possible loss of many civilian lives. Both Wilding and Andrew were mentioned in dispatches for their bravery, with Wilding being posthumously awarded the Distinguished Flying Cross. They are commemorated by a memorial at the junction of Wilding Road and Andrew Road in Wallingford and by the Canadian flag that is flown over Wallingford Town Hall every year on 9 September in their memory.

Paul's Malt on Hithercroft Road, built in 1958, was demolished in 2001; thus the malting industry ended, which had been key to Wallingford for hundreds of years. At one time there were at least 17 maltings in the town.

== Landmarks and structures ==
=== Wallingford Bridge ===
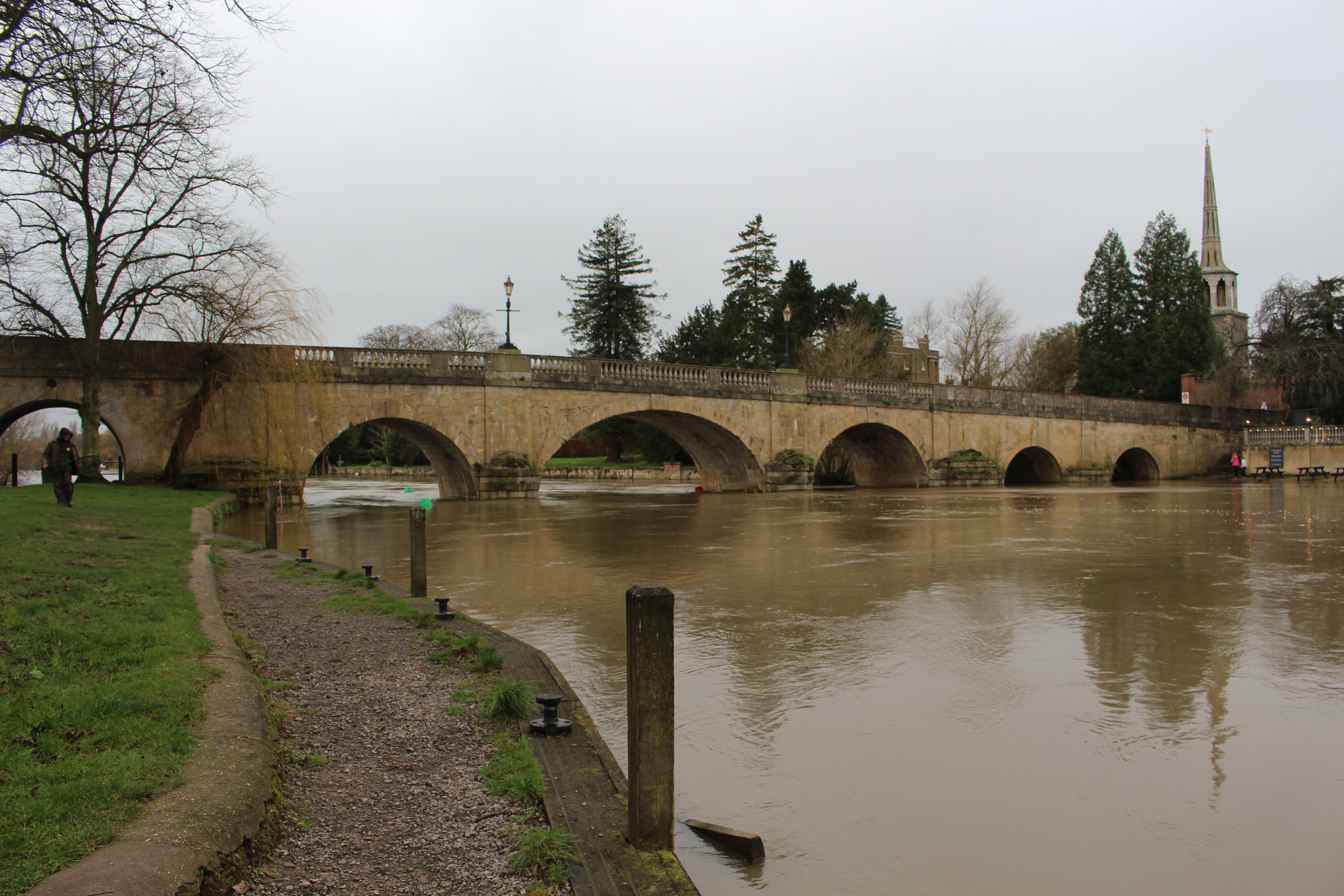
Wallingford Bridge

Wallingford Bridge is a medieval road bridge over the River Thames connecting Wallingford to Crowmarsh Gifford. Wallingford has historically been an important crossing point of the Thames owing to the presence of a ford which was used before the construction of a bridge. This ford was used by William the Conqueror and his armies on his journey to London after his victory at Hastings in 1066. The first reference to a bridge is from 1141 when King Stephen besieged Wallingford Castle. The first stone bridge is credited to Richard, 1st Earl of Cornwall, and four remaining arches are believed to contain 13th-century elements.

Major repairs used stone from the dissolved Holy Trinity Priory in 1530. Four arches were removed so that a drawbridge could be inserted during the siege of the castle in the Civil War of 1646, and these were replaced with timber structures until repair in 1751. Following a flood, three arches were rebuilt by Richard Clarke from 1810–1812 to a design by John Treacher (1760–1836) developed in 1809, and a parapet and balustrade added. The street lights on the bridge were made in the town and feature the Wilder mark on the base.

=== Wallingford Castle ===
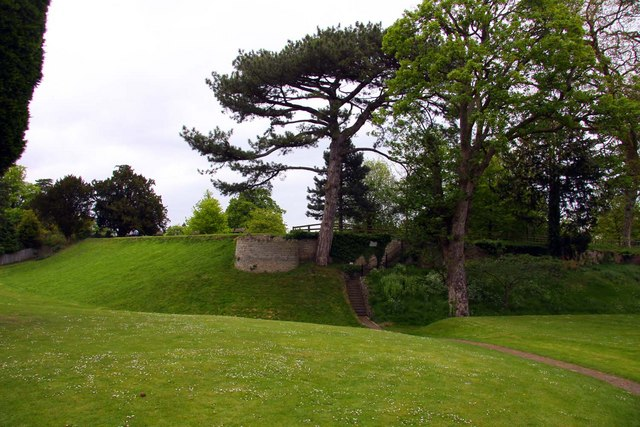
Wallingford Castle

Wallingford Castle was a major medieval castle. Established in the 11th century as a motte-and-bailey design within an Anglo-Saxon burgh, it grew to become what historian Nicholas Brooks has described as "one of the most powerful royal castles of the 12th and 13th centuries". During The Anarchy the castle held the Empress Matilda and her son the future King Henry II. It was the site of the signing of the Treaty of Wallingford, which began the end of the conflict and set the path to a negotiated peace. Over the next two centuries Wallingford became a luxurious castle, used by royalty and their immediate family. After being abandoned as a royal residence by Henry VIII, the castle fell into decline.

Refortified during the English Civil War, Wallingford was held as a Royalist stronghold commanded by Colonel Thomas Blagge. In 1645 General Thomas Fairfax placed Wallingford Castle under siege; after 16 weeks, during which Oxford fell to Parliamentary forces, the castle finally surrendered in July 1646 under generous terms for the defenders. The risk of civil conflict continued, however, and Oliver Cromwell decided that it was necessary to slight the castle in 1652, as it remained a surprisingly powerful fortress and a continuing threat should any fresh uprising occur.

The castle was virtually razed to the ground in the operation, although a brick building continued to be used as a prison into the 18th century. A large house was built in the bailey in 1700, followed by a Gothic mansion house on the same site in 1837. The mansion, abandoned due to rising costs, was demolished in 1972, allowing Wallingford Castle to be declared a scheduled monument as well as a Grade I listed building. The castle grounds, including the remains of St Nicholas College, sections of the castle wall and the motte hill, are now open to the public.

=== St Peter's Church ===
St Peter's Church

An earlier church on the site of St Peter's Church was destroyed in 1646 during the siege of Wallingford in the Civil War. Building of the present church started in 1763, the contractors being William Toovey and Joseph Tuckwell. In 1767 the interior of the church was paved, pews were added and the exterior was stuccoed under the supervision of Sir Robert Taylor. A spire designed by Taylor was added in 1776–77. A local resident, Sir William Blackstone, a lawyer and author of the Commentaries on the Laws of England, took an interest in the building of the spire and paid for the clock face visible from his house. The chancel was built in 1904, designed by Sydney Stephenson. The church was declared redundant on 1 May 1971, and was vested in the Churches Conservation Trust on 26 July 1972. St Peter's is the final resting place of Sir William Blackstone, who is buried in his family vault under the church.

=== St Mary-le-More Church ===
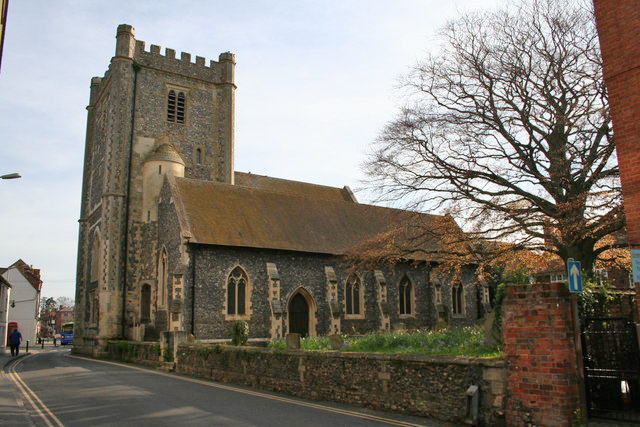
St Mary-le-More's church

The Church of St Mary-le-More is located in a prominent position in the town square behind Wallingford Town Hall. The church appears in records from 1077, when the advowson belonged to St Alban's Abbey. The west bell tower was originally 12th century, but its upper stages were rebuilt in a Perpendicular Gothic style out of the stone from Wallingford Castle when it was demolished by Oliver Cromwell after the Civil War. The nave and aisle were built in the 13th and 14th century, and the chancel was built later. However, all were rebuilt in 1854 to designs by the Gothic Revival architect David Brandon.

The west window of the north aisle has stained glass made in 1856 by Thomas Willement. The pulpit was made in 1888 by the sculptor Onslow Ford. The church tower features a ring of ten bells. A ring of eight including the tenor was cast in 1738 by Richard Phelps and Thomas Lester of the Whitechapel Bell Foundry. Mears and Stainbank of the Whitechapel Bell Foundry re-cast the second bell of that ring, now the fourth bell of the present ring, in 1887, the year of the Golden Jubilee of Queen Victoria. In 2003 the Whitechapel Bell Foundry cast a new treble and second bell, increasing the number of bells to ten.

=== St Leonard's Church ===
St Leonard’s Church

St Leonard’s is the oldest church and is regarded as the oldest surviving place of worship in Wallingford. There has been a church on the site since Saxon times, when it was known as the Church of the Holy Trinity the Lesser. The current building still features distinctive Saxon stone work in the herringbone style around the north wall. Estimates for the start of construction point as early as the 6th century. Parliamentary forces used the church as a barracks during the Siege of Wallingford in 1656. Their occupation caused substantial damage to the building. Repair works were only completed in 1700 when it reopened.

John Henry Hakewill directed a reconstruction of the church in 1849, although the Church was rebuilt in the Gothic Revival style the restoration works preserved large sections of the original Saxon Building. The church interior is noted for a series of four angel murals painted in 1889 by acclaimed artist George Dunlop Leslie who at the time lived on Thames Street. The Church now forms part of the Parish of St Mary-le-More with services being held on Sundays.

=== Wallingford War Memorial ===
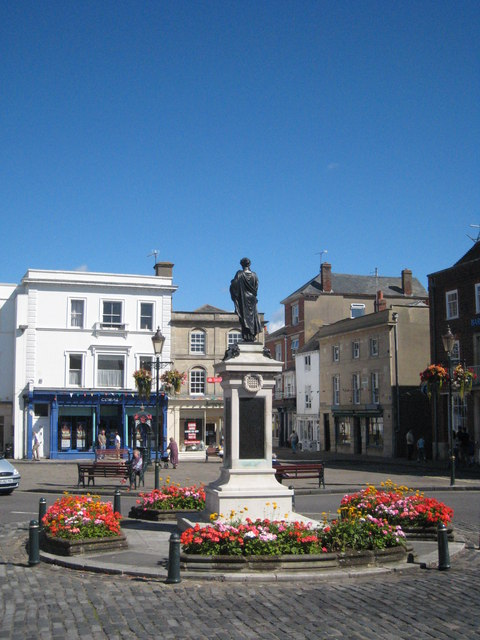
Wallingford War Memorial

Wallingford war memorial was designed by Edward Guy Dawber and William Honeybone, and unveiled in 1921. First World War (1914–1918) – Total names on memorial: 81. After 1945 the memorial was updated with Second World War (1939–1945) dates and names added to the base of the memorial – Total names on memorial: 36. The inscription reads:

TO THE GLORY OF GOD AND IN HONOURED AND GRATEFUL MEMORY OF THE MEN OF WALLINGFORD WHO LAID DOWN THEIR LIVES IN THE GREAT WAR 1914–1918. THEIR NAME LIVETH FOR EVERMORE

PASS NOT THIS STONE IN SORROW
NO SORROW BUT IN PRIDE
AND STRIVE TO LIVE
AS NOBLY AS THEY DIED

The memorial is Grade II listed.

=== Kinecroft ===
The Kinecroft was known as the Canecroft in the 13th and 14th centuries, and in the 16th and 17th centuries as Kenny Croft. It comprises an open area of about seven acres surrounded on the south and western sides by ancient Saxon earthworks and formed part of the defensive fortifications of the town when it was an important Burh in the kingdom of Wessex. Events held in the Kinecroft include Bonfire Night, BunkFest, The Vintage Car Rally, The Wallingford Festival of Cycling and The Circus.

=== Bull Croft ===
The Bull Croft is an open area within the town's Saxon defences. During the Saxon period the Parish Church of the Holy Trinity stood in the southwestern part of the present Bull Croft and by 1085 it had been taken over by the great abbey of St Albans and became part of the new Wallingford Priory. When the Priory was torn down by Cardinal Wolsey in 1525, the area was used as farming. The Bull Croft was given to the town in trust by Mr Powyss Lybbe in 1912 and is now used as a public park. Facilities on the site include a children's play area, tennis courts and football pitches.

=== Town Hall ===
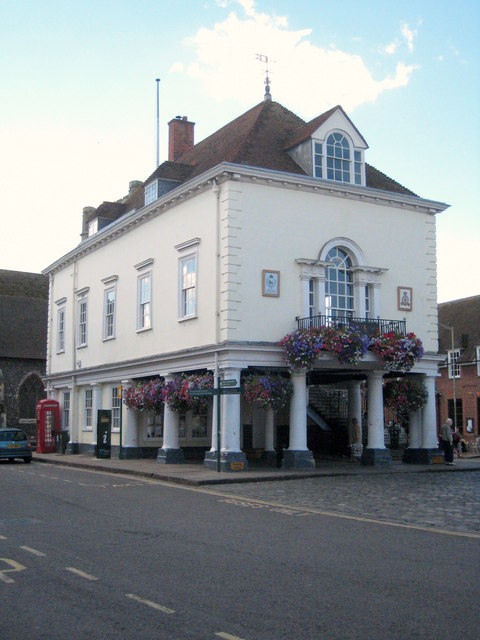
Wallingford Town Hall

Wallingford Town Hall was constructed in 1670 and is located on the southern side of the market square with the War Memorial in front and the church of St Mary-le-More behind. The main hall and council chambers are on the first floor and feature a coved ceiling installed in 1887 to commemorate Queen Victoria's Jubilee. The building currently hosts the Town Council for meetings and civic events. The balcony is used by the town's Mayor at annual events. The ground floor has the town's Tourist Information Office, and, until the corn exchange was built in 1856, the open area under the hall was used for the town's corn market. The hall is open to all residents as a venue for private hire.

=== Corn Exchange ===
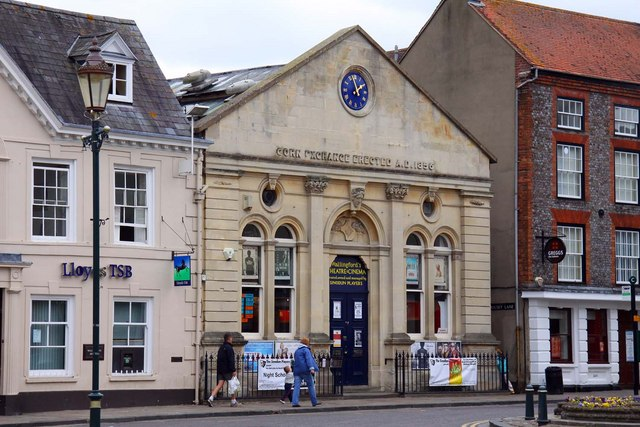
The Corn Exchange

The Corn Exchange dates to 1856. The iron arches supporting the roof of the building were cast at the Wilders Foundry on Goldsmiths Lane. After the Second World War the Social Security Ministry used the Building as a food and unemployment office before it fell into disuse. It was purchased by the Sinodun players in 1975 for use as a theatre. They dedicated it to Agatha Christie, who was president of the society from 1951 to 1976. The Corn Exchange & Sinodun Players were awarded the Queen's Award for Voluntary Service in 2020.

=== Winterbrook House ===
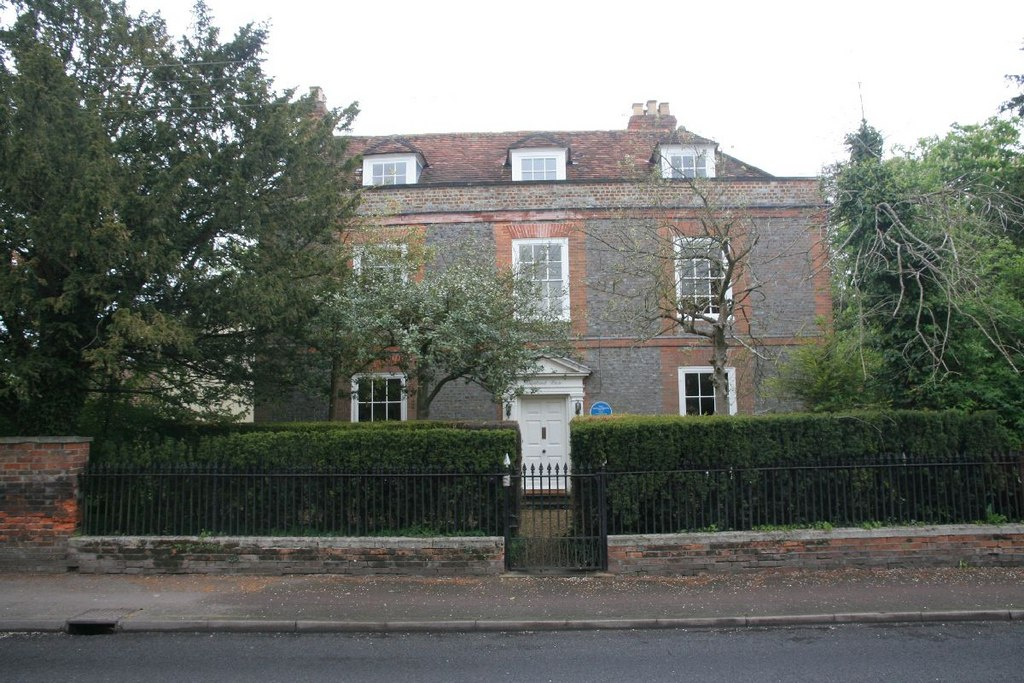
Winterbrook House

Winterbrook House was the home of author Agatha Christie and her husband Max Mallowan from 1934 until her death in 1976 and his in 1978. It is believed that she based the home of her character Miss Marple, Danemead in the village of St. Mary Mead, on Winterbrook House. The house is privately owned and is part of the Agatha Christie Trail.

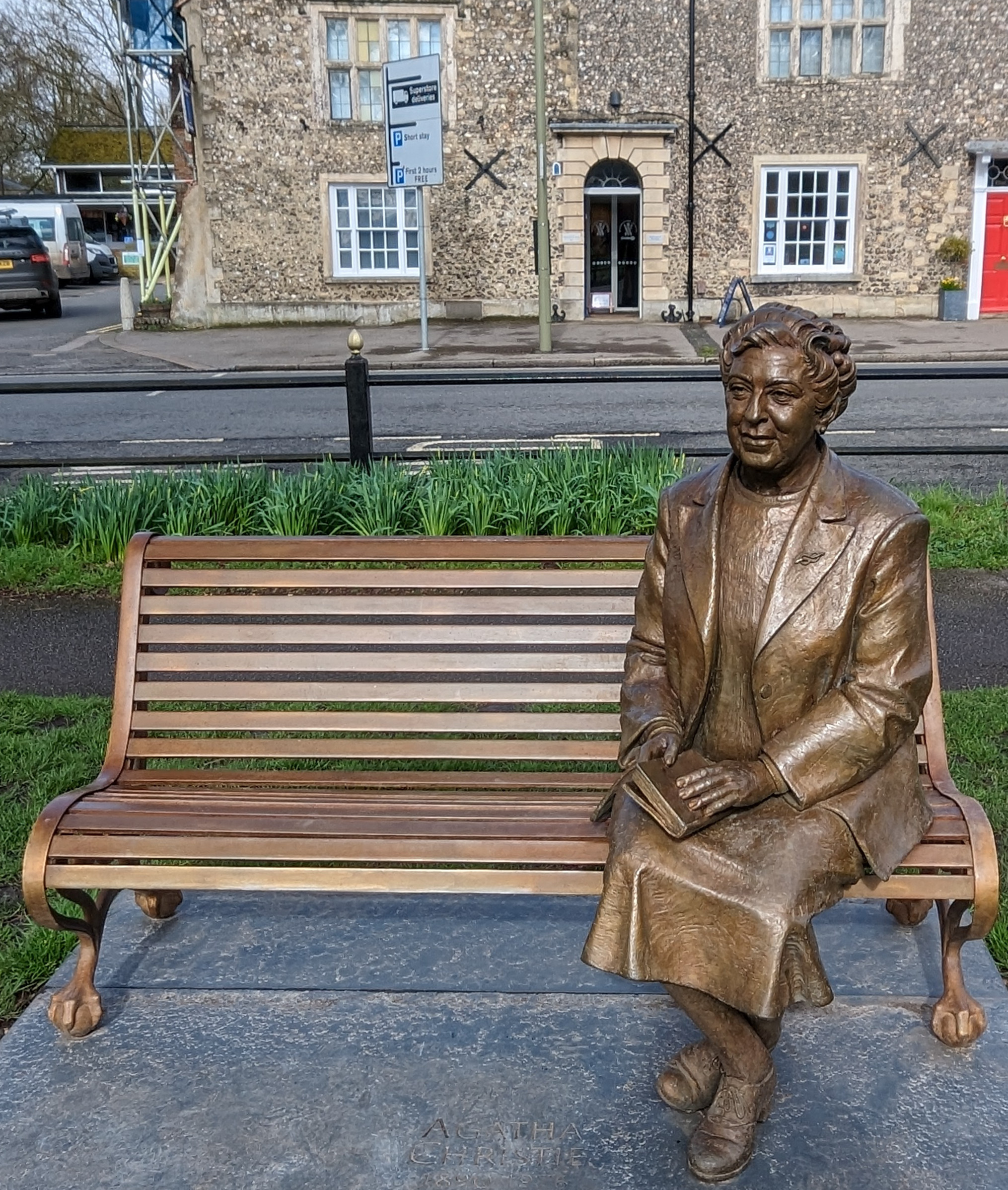
Bronze statue of Agatha Christie at Wallingford

A permanent bronze memorial to Agatha Christie was placed in front of the Wallingford Museum during September- 2023, as sculpted by Ben Twiston-Davies. It depicts her in later life seated on a bench holding a book.

=== Flint House and Wallingford Museum ===
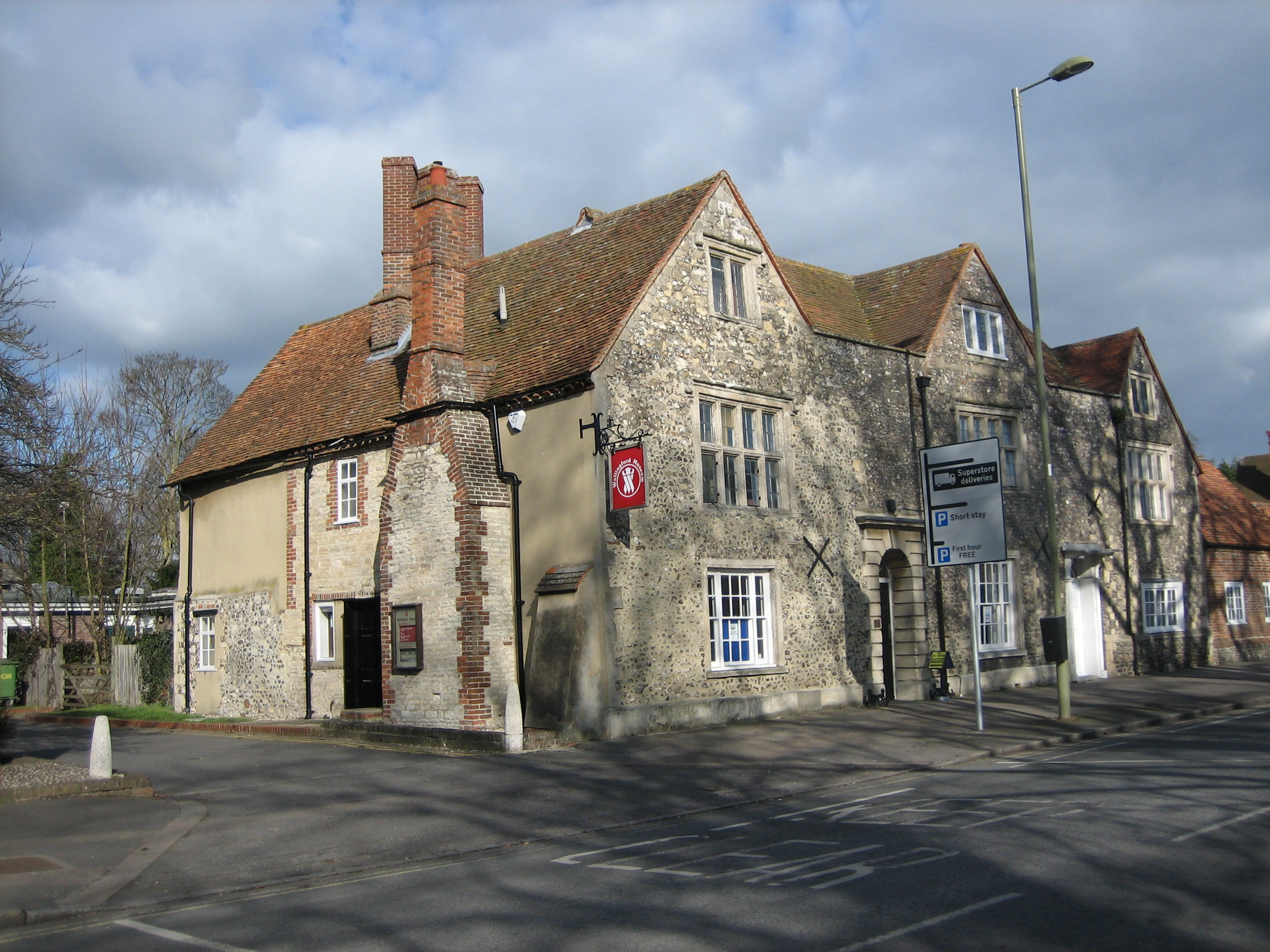
Wallingford Museum

Wallingford Museum has collections of local interest and is housed in the grade II listed Tudor Flint House in the High Street. Flint House is a mid-16th-century timber-framed house with a 17th-century flint façade. It faces the Kinecroft, an open space in Wallingford which is bordered on two sides by Anglo-Saxon burh defences built in the 9th century. It is owned by Wallingford Town Council.

The museum has an extensive collection relating to the town's history. Displays include archaeology, Wallingford Castle, and the town in medieval and Victorian times.

=== Wilders New Foundry, Goldsmiths Lane ===
Built in 1869 by Richard Wilder the new foundry was built to support the existing foundry on Fish Street. By this time there was rapidly increasing demand for the towns of cast iron working and equipment so more capacity was essential. The Building was decommissioned in 1983 and was converted into residential flats by 1984.

== Governance ==
There are three tiers of local government covering Wallingford, at civil parish (town), district, and county level: Wallingford Town Council, South Oxfordshire District Council, and Oxfordshire County Council. The town council meets at the Town Hall and has its offices at 8A Castle Street.

=== Administrative history ===
Wallingford was an ancient borough. It was a borough by the time of the Domesday Book in 1086, at which time it was the largest town in Berkshire. Its first municipal charter was granted in 1156. The borough was subdivided into the four parishes of All Hallows, St Leonard, St Mary-le-More, and St Peter.

The borough was reformed to become a municipal borough in 1836 under the Municipal Corporations Act 1835, which standardised how most boroughs operated across the country. All the parishes in the borough were united into a single civil parish of Wallingford in 1919.

The borough of Wallingford was abolished in 1974 under the Local Government Act 1972, which also transferred Wallingford to Oxfordshire. District-level functions formerly performed by the borough council passed to the new South Oxfordshire District Council. The government initially proposed calling the new district 'Wallingford', but the shadow council elected in 1973 to oversee the transition requested a change of name to 'South Oxfordshire', which was approved by the government before the new district formally came into being.

A successor parish covering the area of the former borough was created in 1974, with its council taking the name Wallingford Town Council.

=== Constituency ===
Since 2024, Wallingford has formed part of the Didcot and Wantage constituency.

There was a Wallingford constituency until 1885. From 1295 until 1832 it covered just the borough. In 1832, it was enlarged to cover several adjoining parts of Berkshire.

== Geography ==
=== Climate ===
As with the rest of the British Isles and Oxfordshire, Wallingford experiences a maritime climate with cool summers and mild winters. There has been a weather station at the nearby Centre for Ecology & Hydrology collecting data on the local climate since 1961. Temperature extremes at Wallingford vary from −21.0 °C (−5.8 °F) recorded in January 1982 to 35.2 °C (95.4 °F) recorded in July 2006. Recent low temperatures include −17.6 °C (0.3 °F) during January 2010 and −17.5 °C (0.5 °F) during December 2010.

Climate data for Wallingford 67m asl, 1971–2000, Extremes 1960– (Sunshine Benson 1961–2000)
Month	Jan	Feb	Mar	Apr	May	Jun	Jul	Aug	Sep	Oct	Nov	Dec	Year
Record high °C (°F)	14.8 (58.6)	17.9 (64.2)	22.2 (72.0)	26.8 (80.2)	29.0 (84.2)	33.9 (93.0)	35.2 (95.4)	35.1 (95.2)	29.4 (84.9)	25.0 (77.0)	17.9 (64.2)	15.2 (59.4)	35.2 (95.4)
Mean daily maximum °C (°F)	7.0 (44.6)	7.5 (45.5)	10.2 (50.4)	12.7 (54.9)	16.6 (61.9)	19.5 (67.1)	22.3 (72.1)	22.0 (71.6)	18.6 (65.5)	14.3 (57.7)	10.0 (50.0)	7.8 (46.0)	14.0 (57.3)
Mean daily minimum °C (°F)	1.2 (34.2)	1.0 (33.8)	2.6 (36.7)	3.8 (38.8)	6.7 (44.1)	9.6 (49.3)	11.9 (53.4)	11.8 (53.2)	9.7 (49.5)	6.8 (44.2)	3.5 (38.3)	2.1 (35.8)	5.9 (42.6)
Record low °C (°F)	−21.0 (−5.8)	−13.2 (8.2)	−11.1 (12.0)	−6.6 (20.1)	−3.3 (26.1)	−2.2 (28.0)	2.0 (35.6)	1.1 (34.0)	−2.8 (27.0)	−5.5 (22.1)	−9.6 (14.7)	−17.5 (0.5)	−21 (−6)
Average precipitation mm (inches)	56.36 (2.22)	38.54 (1.52)	43.76 (1.72)	46.54 (1.83)	50.09 (1.97)	52.66 (2.07)	38.44 (1.51)	53.64 (2.11)	56.71 (2.23)	58.98 (2.32)	57.91 (2.28)	61.46 (2.42)	615.09 (24.2)
Mean monthly sunshine hours	52.7	67.8	114.7	150.0	198.4	201.0	210.8	192.2	147.0	102.3	66.0	46.5	1,549.4
Source 1: Royal Dutch Meteorological Institute
Source 2: RMets

== Transport ==
=== River ===
The River Thames has been a transport route for centuries, and Wallingford's growth as a town relied partly on it. Coal was supplied from North East England by coaster to London and then by barge upriver to Wallingford. This supply could be unreliable in seasons when river currents were too strong or water levels were too low. In 1789 the Oxford Canal reached Oxford from Warwickshire, and the Duke's Cut at Wolvercote gave it a connection to the Thames. This allowed coal from the Midlands to reach Wallingford by a shorter and more reliable route than by sea and river from the northeast. In 1799 the Oxford Canal consolidated its commercial position by buying an 80-year lease on a wharf on the Thames just above Wallingford Bridge.

Chalmore Lock, a summer or low-water lock and weir, was built at Chalmore Hole, Wallingford in 1838, However, much of the time the fall was only 18 inches, and the lock was open at both ends. It fell into disrepair, and the lock was removed in 1883. The missing lock is the subject of confusion in Jerome K. Jerome's "Three Men in a Boat". A ferry had operated at the site from 1787 to transport horses across the river where the towpath changed banks. As the removal of the lock and weir meant that this was the longest clear stretch of the upper river, it was an ideal site for rowing, so the Oxford University Boat Club which had long trained here built a boathouse at Chalmore in 2006. In addition to the old Wallingford Bridge, a new bridge was built at Winterbrook in 1993 to carry the A4130 bypass around Wallingford.

=== Rail ===
The closest regular railway station to Wallingford is Cholsey, about three miles away. The Cholsey and Wallingford Railway is a heritage railway which runs along the old branch line between Cholsey and Wallingford.

The main line of the Great Western Railway passes to the south of Wallingford. A station called Wallingford Road opened with the line in 1840, but it was some 3 miles (4.8 km) away from the town itself, in open countryside between the villages of Cholsey and Moulsford.

On 2 July 1866 the Wallingford and Watlington Railway (W&WR) was opened between Wallingford Road station (which was renamed Moulsford station at the same time) and a new Wallingford station, on the western side of the town. The plan had been to continue the branch line to Watlington, but in May 1866, the Overend, Gurney & Co bank had crashed, causing one of the severest financial crises of the 19th century. The bank rate was raised to ten percent, which made it impossible for the W&WR to raise the capital for its planned continuation. The company sold the line to the Great Western Railway in 1872, and it became known as the Wallingford Bunk. The junction station for the branch line was moved from Moulsford to a new station at Cholsey in 1892. British Railways closed the branch line to passengers in 1959 and to goods traffic in 1965, but the track between Hithercroft Road and Cholsey continued in use to serve the now demolished maltings until 1981 when BR removed the junction at Cholsey. The branch line was then preserved as the Cholsey and Wallingford Railway, which opened a new Wallingford station in 1985 for its tourist services, a short distance south of the original Wallingford station, which had been redeveloped.

=== Bus ===
All bus services for the town are operated by Thames Travel. The 33 operates every hour from Shiplake to Abingdon via Henley on Thames, Nuffield, Nettlebed, Wallingford, Didcot, Sutton Courtenay and Culham. The X40 operates every 20 minutes (every 30 minutes on weekends) between Oxford and Reading via Wallingford and Woodcote.

== Economy ==
Castle Street and High Street corner

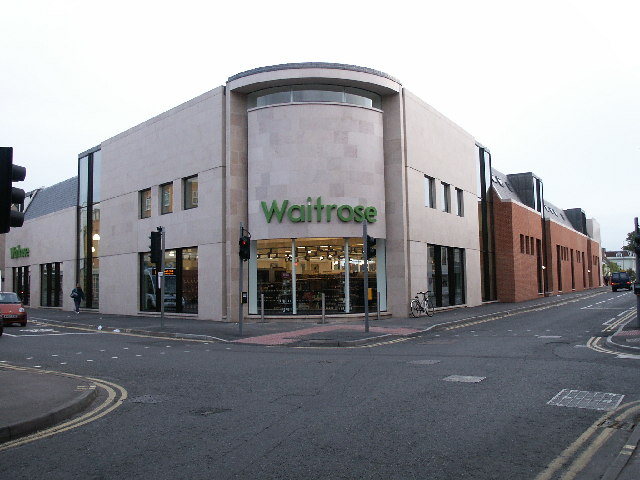
Waitrose branch

Historically, Wallingford was a centre for local trading in livestock and corn as well as the general trade of other goods. This decreased after the construction of the bridge at Abingdon. The town developed as a centre for the production of iron and machinery in the 18th century; this continued until the 1980s. The brewing industry was important with two breweries and 17 maltings in the town. This link was ended with the demolition of Paul's Malt in 2001. The Lamb arcade was originally known as the Lamb Coaching Inn and in 1980 after being derelict for some years was converted into an Antiques Arcade. Champions hardware store has been serving the residents of the town since 1869.

In 2005, Waitrose moved into a new store in the town centre after occupying an old site in the south of the town for decades. The new store has 22,000 sq ft (2,000 m^{2}) of retail space. A Lidl supermarket opened in January 2019 on the Hithercroft Road. The only banking facility left in the town is the Nationwide Building Society, There are three cashpoints available in the town. The main employers are primarily on the Hithercroft Trading Estate, established in the 1970s. There are some located at Howbury Park the other side of the river and also at Winterbrook Bridge. Rowse Honey is the UK's largest manufacturer of honey and has been located in the town since 1987, after being founded in the nearby village of Ewelme in 1954. Other businesses are the Royal Mail, HR Wallingford, Centre for Ecology and Hydrology and Fugro. To the south east of the town is the headquarters for the non-profit agricultural organisation CABI.

== Sport and leisure ==
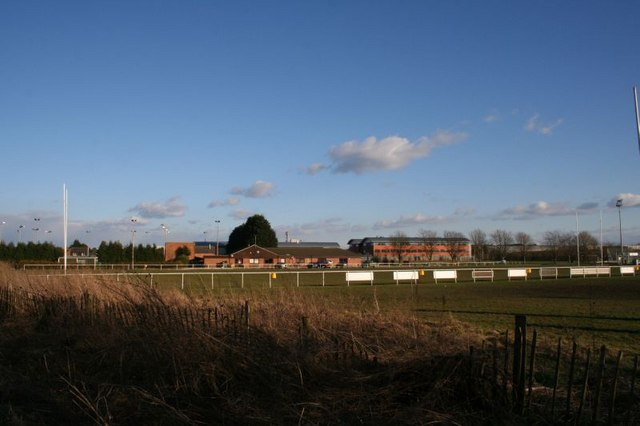
Wallingford Sports Park

A number of sports societies, clubs and associations are co-located at the Wallingford Sports Park. Wallingford Hockey Club traces its beginnings to 1894 and now comprises nine senior teams as well as the Wallingford Wildcats youth setup. Since 1995 the club has been based in the Wallingford Sports Centre. Wallingford Town F.C. was founded in 1922 is the local football club. They currently play in the Hellenic Football League, and their home games are played at the Wallingford Sports Centre.

Originally founded in 1967 as Cholsey RFC, the club changed its name to Wallingford Rugby Club when it moved to the Hithercroft sports ground in 1997. The club has a senior set up which includes fielding three competitive men's senior teams as a development squad and three women's teams known as the Maidens. The club is still headquartered on the Hithercroft which is now known as the Wallingford Sports Park. There are two Squash clubs in Wallingford. Wallingford Squash Club is in the town centre and the second is located at the Wallingford Sports Park. Pétanque Wallingford is based at the Park. Wallingford Castle Archers are also based at the Sports Park.

=== Rowing ===
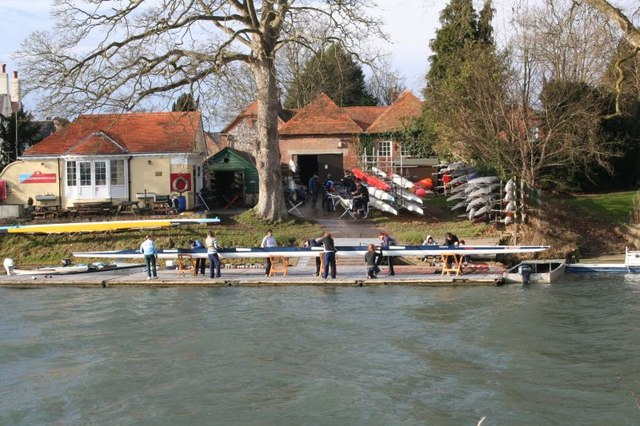
Wallingford Rowing Club

Wallingford Regatta, formerly the Wallingford Skiff Regatta, was the only organised boating competition in 1949 on the longest stretch of the Thames between locks (Benson to Cleeve Locks). It had taken place every year in peacetime since the late 1890s, and there is evidence that it existed as early as 1861. In 1949 the regatta committee founded the Wallingford Rowing Club, which started competing in other regattas. The regatta was developed as a conventional regatta, although it still awards the Wallingford Skiff Regatta Cup. The town hosts the Wallingford Rowing Club, the Oxford Brookes University Boat Club. and the Oxford University Boat Club.

The regatta was held on the same reach at Wallingford for most of its existence, but river conditions caused problems, and there was a growing need for larger facilities. In 2001 the Regatta moved to a new home at Dorney Lake near Windsor where it is still held. The event is the largest single day rowing regatta in the UK. In 2008 the new Oxford University Boat Club opened in Wallingford. Located on the site of the disused Wallingford marina on the Thames Path, the building designed by Tuke Manton Architects LLP replaced the club's historic home on the Isis, which was destroyed by fire in 1999.

=== Wallingford festival of cycling ===
The Wallingford Festival of Cycling started in 2015 with an attendance of 3000. In 2018 British cycling billed the event one of the largest cycling events of the year with events including both the 50 km and 110 km road sportives. In excess of 7500 were expected to attend. The event in 2015 was used as the backdrop for the filming of the Midsomer Murders episode called breaking the Chain. Breaking the Chain was the third episode of the 18th series.

=== Music festivals ===
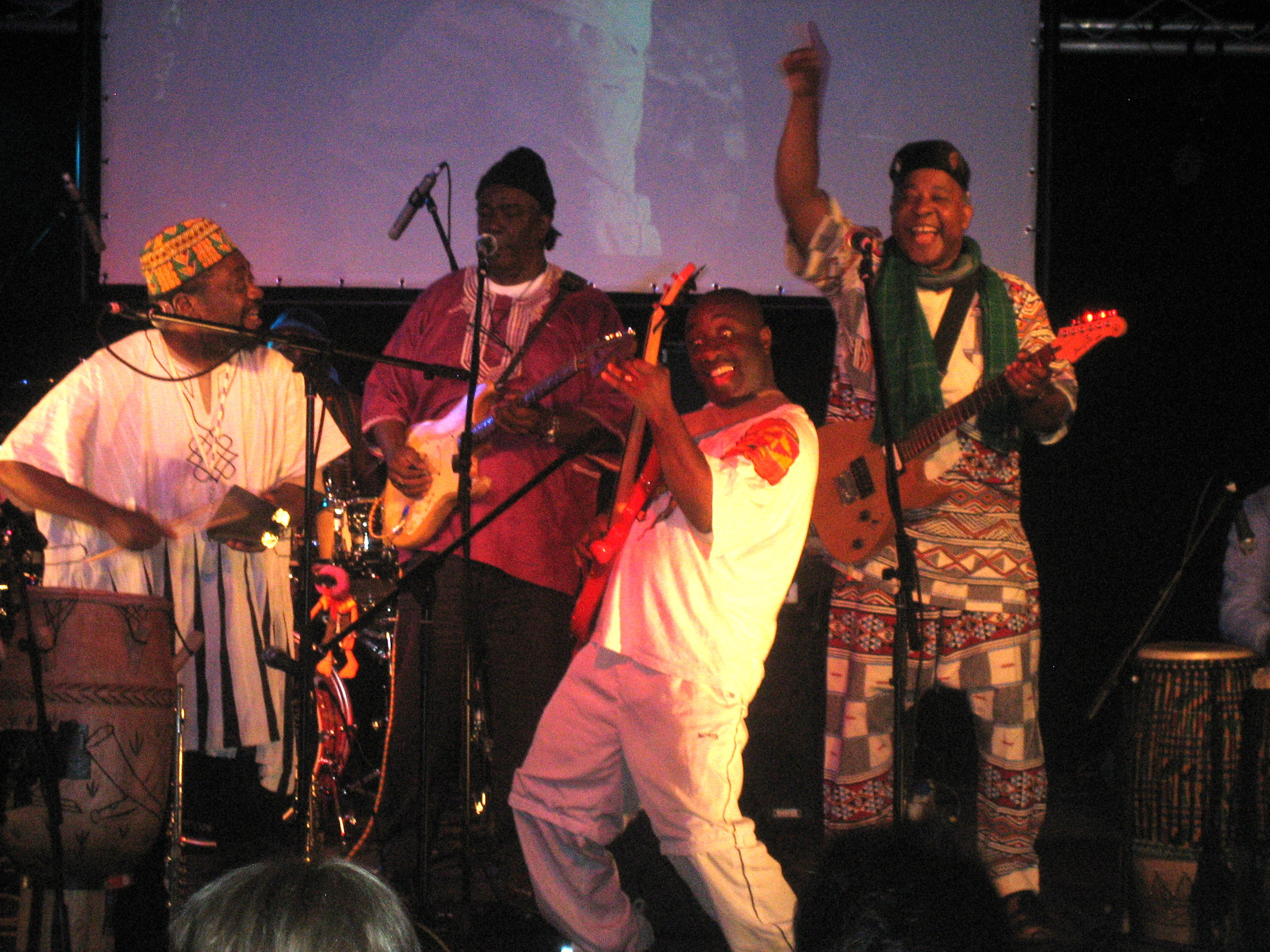
Osibisa

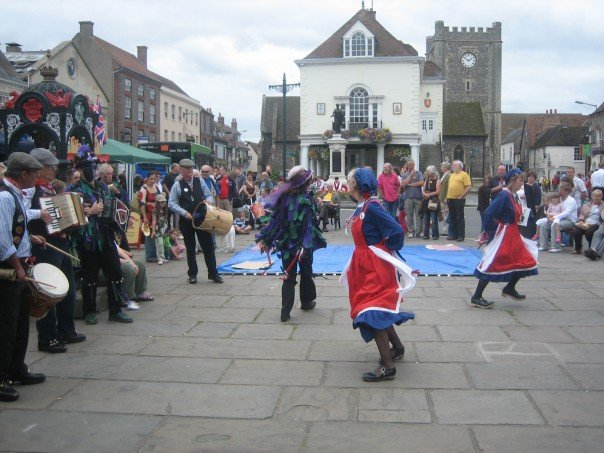
Dancing in the Market Square, Wallingford, at BunkFest

Starting in 2002 in the Cross Keys pub, BunkFest, usually being held in the first week of September, has become the largest free multi-day festival in the UK with an attendance of over 25,000 in 2017. The BunkFest folk music festival combines a broad range of folk music, dance displays, a beer festival and the local "Bunk" steam railway. It is a not-for-profit festival. The festival is intended to appeal to a wide audience. The main stage features light music and dancing during the day and lively folk-rock and world music acts in the evening.

Other venues around the town feature a wide variety of acts, ranging from folk artists and singer-songwriters to rock bands. It attracts between thirty and fifty dance sides. The dance programme has included Cotswold and Border Morris, Appalachian and Eastern European forms, as well as traditional Irish, Scottish and Welsh forms.

=== Vintage Car Rally ===
Founded in 2002 the Wallingford vintage car rally takes place on the Kinecroft in mid May with a parade that includes the whole town. In 2018 the number of cars in the parade increased to over 350, with just over 400 vehicles on show overall. The event is run for local charitable causes and raised £14,000 in 2018, which brought the cumulative total to over £100,000.

== Local media ==
Local news and television programmes are provided by BBC South and ITV Meridian. Television signals are received from the Oxford TV transmitter.

Wallingford local radio stations are BBC Radio Oxford on 95.2 FM, Heart South on 102.6 FM, Greatest Hits Radio on 106.4 FM and Wallingford Radio, a community based radio station that broadcasts on 107.3 FM.

Local newspapers are the Herald Series and Oxfordshire Guardian.

== Education ==
St John's (a primary school), Fir Tree, (a junior school), and St Nicholas (an infants' school) are all located within the town itself, with additional primary schools at Brightwell-cum-Sotwell, Cholsey and Crowmarsh Gifford serving the surrounding areas.

=== Wallingford School ===
Wallingford School is the successor to Wallingford Grammar School, founded in 1659 when Walter Bigg left money for a school in his will. Located to the north of the town, it is an academy school and part of the Merchant Taylors’ Oxfordshire Academy Trust. The school provides education for the Wallingford area for boys and girls between the ages of 11 and 18. The majority of pupils from both Fir Tree and St John's continue on to Wallingford School. Wallingford School also draws pupils from Crowmarsh, Brightwell-cum-Sotwell, Cholsey and Warborough primary schools and occasionally Didcot primary schools.

== Town twinning ==
Wallingford is twinned with:

- Bad Wurzach, Germany
- Luxeuil-les-Bains, France

Wallingford has an informal link to:

- Wallingford, Connecticut, United States

== Notable people ==
In the town:

- Jonathan Bailey, actor
- Kevin Bailey, poet
- Evelyn Barbirolli, oboist
- William Blackstone, legal writer
- Charlie Brooker, comedy writer and presenter
- John Buckley, sculptor
- Agatha Christie, mystery writer and playwright, lived in Winterbrook House with her second husband Sir Max Mallowan.
- Paul Conroy, music executive
- William Henry Davies (entrepreneur), Toronto meatpacker (peameal bacon)
- John Dreyer, football player
- Gary Elkins, football player
- Edgar Field, England footballer and winner of the FA Cup in 1880
- Peter Flannery, playwright and screenwriter
- Dulcie Gray, actress
- James Hayllar, Mary Hayllar et al family of artists
- Geoffrey Keen, actor
- Peter R. Kiff, sedimentologist and chemist
- George Dunlop Leslie, artist
- Max Mallowan, archaeologist, at Winterbrook House with Agatha Christie
- James H. McClure, mystery writer
- Ann Packer, Olympic athlete
- Alex Pearce, football player
- Zac Purchase, Olympic athlete
- Edmund Charles Rawlings, politician
- Moses Roper, former slave
- Paul Rotha, documentary filmmaker
- Gladys Bronwyn Stern, novelist
- Simon Watson Taylor, actor, translator and surrealist
- Thomas Tusser, poet
- John of Wallingford (died 1214), monk and abbot of St. Albans Abbey
- John of Wallingford (died 1258), monk and chronicler
- Richard of Wallingford, mathematician and clockmaker
- Richard of Wallingford, organiser in the Peasants' Revolt
- William of Wallingford, builder of Wallingford Screen at St Albans Cathedral
- Rex Warner, writer
- Peter Cathcart Wason, psychologist
- Charles West, mystery writer

=== Members of Parliament ===
Wallingford used to return two Members of Parliament (MPs). This was cut to one in 1832 and none in 1885. Its prominent MPs, often not resident, included:

- William Seymour Blackstone, builder of Howbery Park, Crowmarsh Gifford
- Thomas Browne (High Sheriff of Kent), Chancellor of the Exchequer
- John Cator, timber merchant
- Thomas Digges, astronomer
- Sir Charles Dilke, 1st Baronet, promoter of the Great Exhibition
- Edmund Dunch, member of the Kit-Kat Club
- Sir John Fortescue, Chancellor of the Exchequer
- George Parker, 2nd Earl of Macclesfield, astronomer
- Sir Thomas Parry, Comptroller of the Household to Elizabeth I
- George Pigot, Baron Pigot, British governor of Madras
- Robert Pigot, Lieutenant General in the American Revolutionary War
- Edmund Plowden, lawyer who defended religious freedom
- Francis Sykes, builder of Basildon Park
- Nathaniel William Wraxall, writer

== Sources ==
- Aston, Michael; Bond, James (1976). The Landscape of Towns. Archaeology in the Field Series. London: J. M. Dent & Sons Ltd. pp. 31, 62, 66, 67, 86, 106, 110, 122. ISBN 978-0-460-04194-2.
- Bullen, L. (1989). Poor Man's Guide to the History of Wallingford (2nd revised ed.). Wallingford: Wallingford Magazine.
- Compton, Hugh J. (1976). The Oxford Canal. Newton Abbot: David & Charles. pp. 58–59. ISBN 978-0-7153-7238-8.
- Dewey, J; Dewey, S (1977). The Book of Wallingford, an Historical Portrait. Buckingham: Barracuda Books. ISBN 978-0-86023-033-5.
- Griffin, S (2000). Wallingford in the English Civil War, 1642–1646. Stuart Press.
- Ditchfield, P. H.; Page, William, eds. (1907). A History of the County of Berkshire. Victoria County History. Vol. 2. London: Archibald Constable & Co. pp. 99–101, 103–106.
- Hedges, J. K. (1881). The History of Wallingford, in the County of Berks, from the invasion of Julius Caesar to the present time. London: William Clowes & Sons.
- Page, William; Ditchfield, P. H., eds. (1923). A History of the County of Berkshire. Victoria County History. Vol. 3. assisted by John Hautenville Cope. London: The St Katherine Press. pp. 517–546.
- Pedgley, David E.; Clark, David (2011). "Flint House and Flint Cottage, Wallingford". Oxoniensia. 76: 280–285. ISSN 0308-5562.
- Pevsner, Nikolaus (1966). Berkshire. The Buildings of England. Penguin Books.
- Rodwell, K. A., ed. (1975). Historic Towns in Oxfordshire: a Survey of the New County. Oxfordshire Archaeological Unit. ISBN 978-0-904220-02-5.
