= Wallingford School =

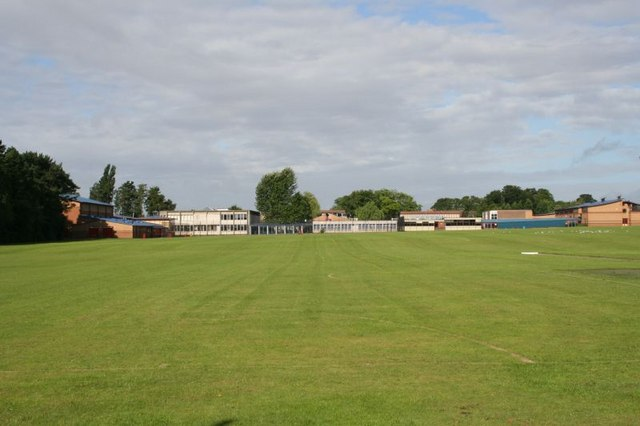

Location
- St George's Road; Wallingford, Oxfordshire, OX10 8HH; England; 51°36′20″N 1°07′38″W

Information
- Type: Comprehensive; Academy
- Motto: Sending every person into the world able and qualified.
- Established: 1659; 367 years ago
- Founder: Walter Bigg
- Local authority: Oxfordshire
- Trust: The Merchant Taylors’ Oxfordshire Academy Trust
- Specialist: Sports College
- Department for Education URN: 137357 Tables
- Ofsted: Reports
- Head teacher: John Marston
- Years taught: 7-13
- Gender: Coeducational
- Age: 11 to 18
- Enrolment: 1411
- Houses: Bigg, Blackstone, Matilda, Christie
- Colours: Navy and Gold
- Website: www.wallingford.oxon.sch.uk

Wallingford School is a comprehensive co-educational secondary school with academy status located in the town of Wallingford, Oxfordshire, England. It was founded by Walter Bigg in 1659 in association with the Worshipful Company of Merchant Taylors, formally succeeding Wallingford Grammar School when it merged with Blackstone Secondary Modern in 1973.

== Headteacher ==
The Headteacher is John Marston who joined the school in September 2019 following the retirement of the previous head, Wyll Willis. Willis was the Headteacher from 2006 to 2019, following the interim Headship of Douglas Brown. The Headteacher from September 2001 to August 2005 was Jerry Owens.

== Buildings ==
A number of buildings make up the school estate. These are named after various notable people from Wallingford or past teachers at the school.

The main blocks are:

- The Blackstone Building: found in 2023 to contain RAAC is currently off limits to students, and has since been given funding to be rebuilt by the UK government.
- The Main Building: with Reception, English, The School Hall, the Canteen, The Old Gym, Design & Technology, ICT, and many admin rooms.
- The Kershaw Building: with Maths, Drama, Music and Modern Foreign Language.
- The Doug Brown Building (formally named as the 'Science Block'): with Science and Technicians Offices. Since 2023 Art has moved to the upstairs of The Doug Brown Building due to RAAC in The Blackstone Building
- The Castle Leisure Centre (also known as 'The Castle' or 'The Sports Hall'): for PE lessons and large assemblies.
- The Willis Block: with Geography, History, Science, Modern Foreign Languages, RS, Stem, Psychology classrooms along other admin rooms.

In recent years, Wallingford School has built a new block, The Willis Block, to be able to expand their size of entry to 9 forms in Year 7, a major increase from 7 forms just 2 years before the construction.

== Sixth form ==
Wallingford School features two parts - the secondary school, and a sixth form college which merge to feature the same teachers, lesson structure, subjects, timetable, etc... Sixth Form students are part of the house system and have their own competitions that contribute to the overall scores.

All students at Wallingford School are guaranteed a place in Sixth Form, whatever their results at 16.

The main focus of the Sixth Form is A Levels. However, from September 2008, a small number of students each term in the sixth form can follow a "Pre A-Level" course that enables them to study for A-Levels if they did not achieve the required GCSE grades to do so by regular progression. These students can spend a year studying five GCSE subjects to retake, then continue with A Levels at the sixth form. There is a growing offer of Btec qualifications for students wanting to study but who want a different approach to the academic one of A Levels.

== Past pupils ==
- Charlie Brooker, journalist, screenwriter and TV presenter
- Matt Rodda, politician and Member of Parliament for Reading East (2017–present)
- Rob Wilson, politician and Member of Parliament for Reading East (2005–2017)
- Hayden Ellingworth, actor and author
- Mia Venner, English Rugby Union player
- William Thomas, PGA golfer
