= St Mary-le-More, Wallingford =

Church of St Mary-le-More
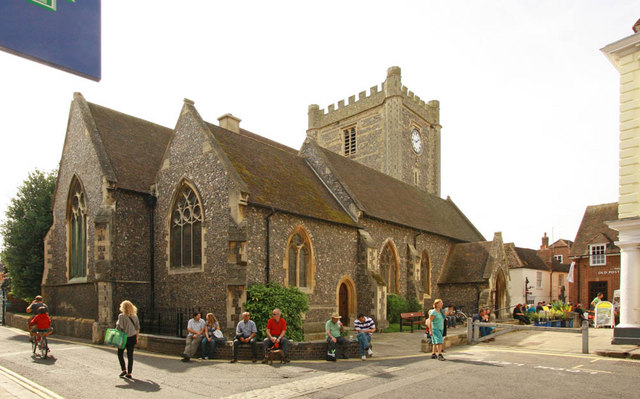

- Location within Oxfordshire
- 51.5996°N 1.1249°W
- Location: Wallingford, Oxfordshire, England
- Denomination: Church of England
- Website: www.marylemore.co.uk

Architecture
- Heritage designation: Grade II listed
- Architectural type: Church
- Style: Gothic revival

Administration
- Province: Canterbury
- Diocese: Oxford
- Archdeaconry: Dorchester on Thames

Clergy
- Vicar: Vacant

St Mary-le-More is a Church of England parish church in Wallingford, Oxfordshire, England. The church is situated in the centre of The Marketplace, just behind the Town Hall.

== History ==
St Mary le More existed by 1077, when the advowson belonged to St Alban's Abbey. The west tower was originally 12th century but its upper stages were rebuilt in a Perpendicular Gothic style in about 1653. The nave and aisle were built in the 13th and 14th century and the chancel was built somewhat later, but all were rebuilt in 1854 to designs by the Gothic Revival architect David Brandon.

In the present building, the west window of the north aisle has stained glass made in 1856 by Thomas Willement. The pulpit was made in 1888 by the sculptor Onslow Ford. St Mary-le-More is a Grade II* listed building.

In 2009–10 the church was reordered and redecorated. Underfloor heating was installed and the floor retiled, two separate lavatories were installed beneath the mezzanine level. One toilet is designed for disabled use and it also contains baby changing facilities. A black marble topped kitchen was installed with sink, built-in fridge, dishwasher and cupboard space in the north aisle near to the external fire door.

Internal and external access for disabled people was improved by means of level flooring and ramps to allow wheelchair access to most parts of the building. An audio-visual system with hearing loop was also installed. The audio-visual system is used regularly during services, concerts and by those hiring out the church building for events.

The site of Lady Chapel subsequently became the larger choir vestry during the reordering. The Lady Chapel was then moved to the dais of the former High Altar in the Sanctuary just beyond the retained choir stalls. The newly sited Lady Chapel now serves as a quiet area for those visiting the church when it is open to the general public and prior to regular acts of worship.

The main altar used during services of Holy Communion is now centrally placed on the raised dais in front of the Rood Screen in the nave. This altar can be moved during concerts, services and other events that require full use of the dais.

A meeting room was formed above the Clergy vestry within the second (middle) chamber of the tower. Access to the meeting room is granted by means of a new internal staircase and mezzanine floor. Further storage for chairs and other ancillaries is contained on and beneath the mezzanine structure.

The pews were largely replaced by modern lightweight stacking chairs as part of the reordering works. The only pews which were retained are those used by the Mayor of Wallingford and Town Council during Civic Services throughout the year. These are now sited along the walls of the nave and north aisle respectively. Further solid oak chairs were bought for use in the re-sited Lady Chapel. These are in the traditional Gothic Revival style.

Additional liturgical furniture, fixtures and fittings have been acquired or donated for use at St. Mary le More since the initial reordering of 2009–2010. Of particular mention is the wall banner found to the left of the 20th Century Rood Screen which denotes the appropriate season of the liturgical year. These have been created by several members of the congregation between 2017 and 2019. The banners were designed and installed under the direction of the then Rector, Revd. David Rice and members of the Parochial Church Council.

== Bells ==
The tower has a ring of 10 bells. A ring of eight including the tenor was cast in 1738 by Richard Phelps and Thomas Lester of the Whitechapel Bell Foundry. Mears and Stainbank of the Whitechapel Bell Foundry re-cast the second bell of that ring (now the fourth bell of the present ring) in 1887, the year of the Golden Jubilee of Queen Victoria. In 2003 the Whitechapel Bell Foundry cast a new treble and second bell, increasing the ring to 10.

== Sources ==
- Page, W.H.; Ditchfield, P.H., eds. (1923). A History of the County of Berkshire, Volume 3. Victoria County History. pp. 539–546.
- Pevsner, Nikolaus (1966). Berkshire. The Buildings of England. Harmondsworth: Penguin Books. pp. 247–248.
