= Winterbrook Bridge =

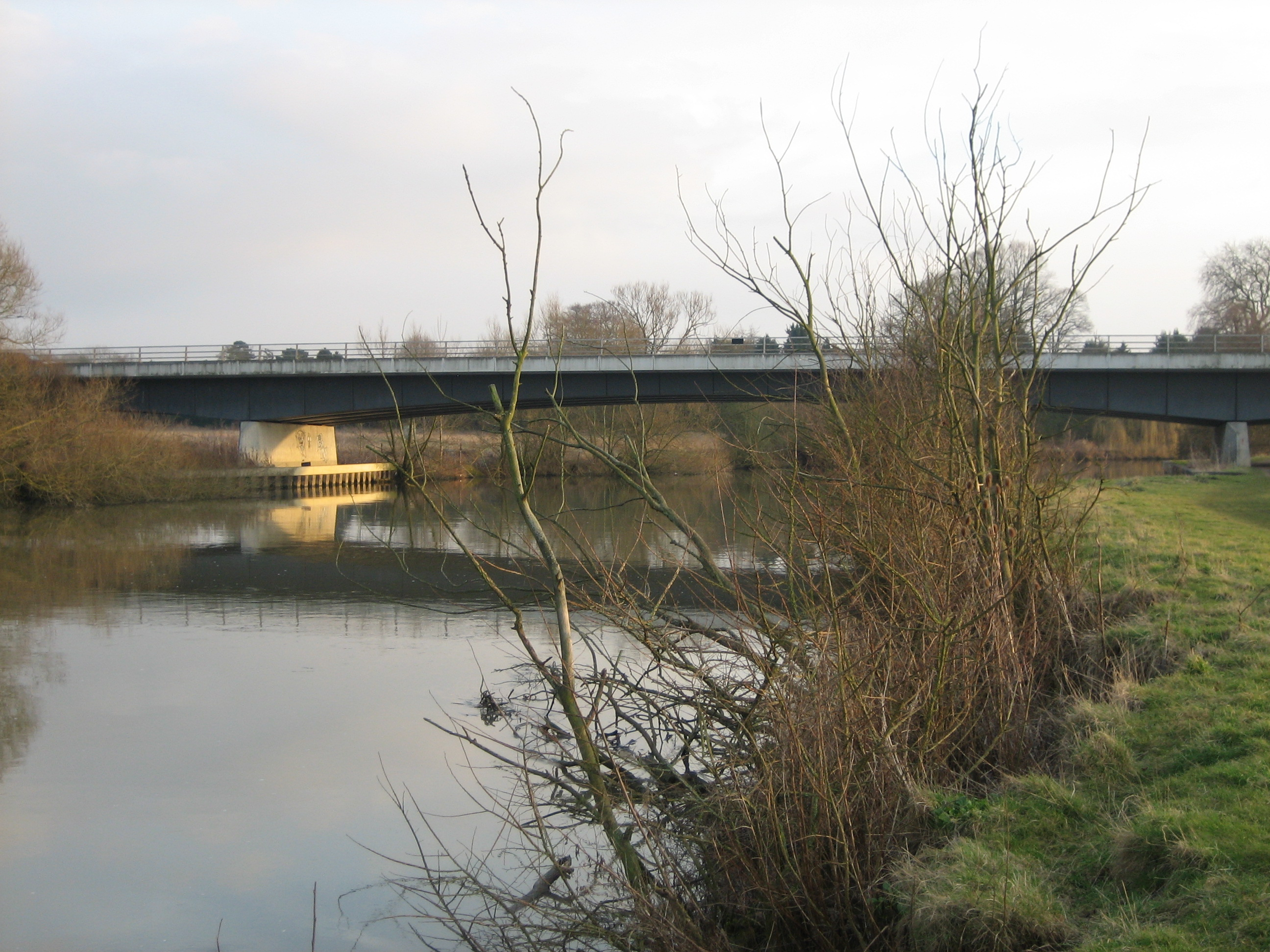
- Winterbrook Bridge from upstream
- Coordinates: 51°35′18.5″N 1°07′24.5″W
- Carries: A4130 road
- Crosses: River Thames
- Locale: Wallingford
- Maintained by: Oxfordshire County Council

Characteristics
- Material: Concrete and steel
- Total length: 55 metres (180 ft)
- Height: 15 feet 9 inches (4.80 m)
- No. of spans: 3

History
- Opened: 1993

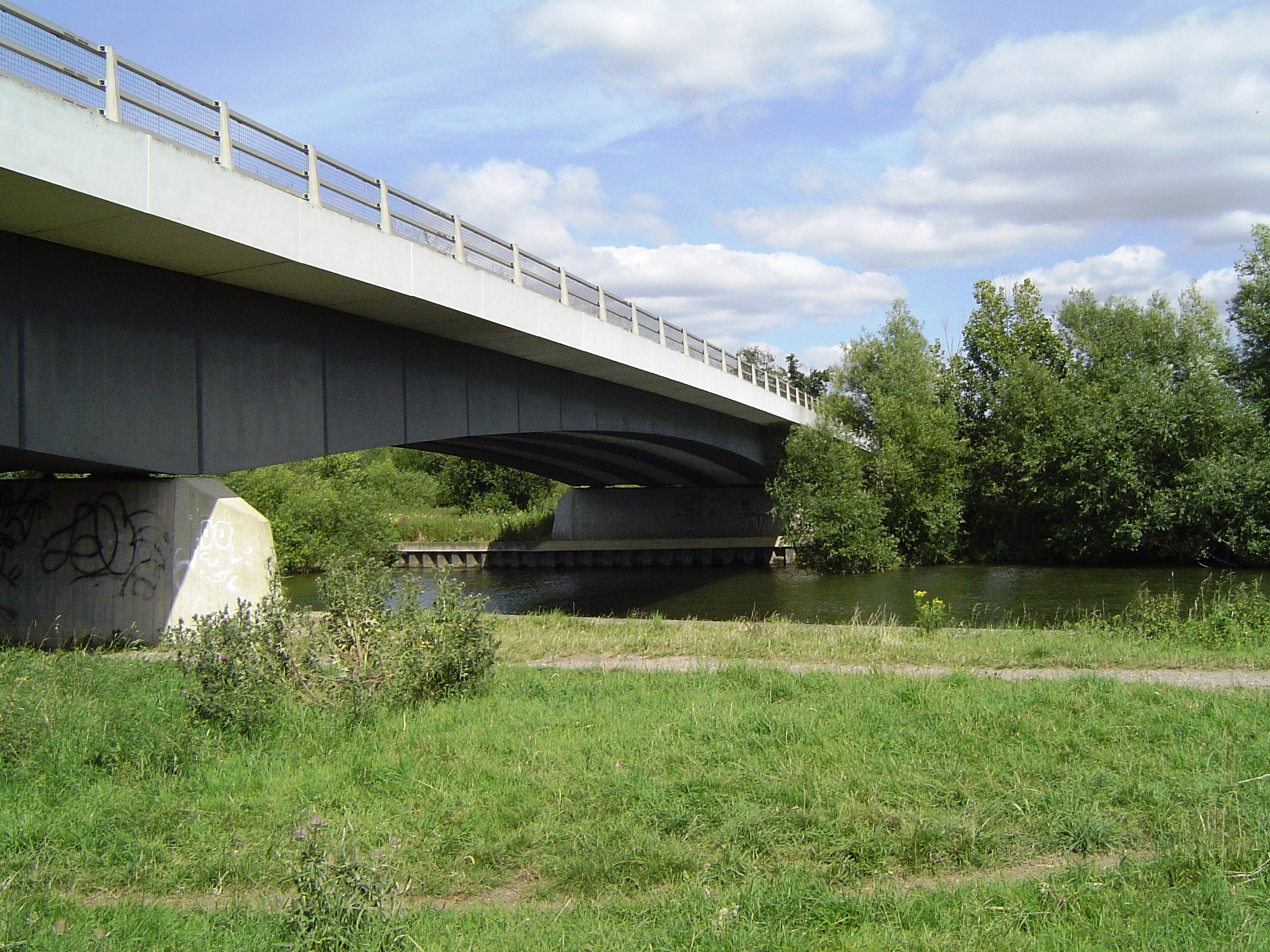
Winterbrook Bridge from the side

Winterbrook Bridge, also known as Wallingford Bypass Bridge, was built in 1993 as part of a bypass around Wallingford, Oxfordshire, to relieve congestion on the single-lane Wallingford Bridge. It forms part of the A4130, connecting Winterbrook, at the north end of Cholsey, just south of Wallingford, on the west bank, to Mongewell on the east bank. The bridge crosses the Thames on the reach between Cleeve Lock and Benson Lock. The 55-metre (180 ft) three-span bridge is built of steel plate girders with a reinforced concrete deck slab and glass fibre reinforced plastic cladding on the underside.

During construction, remains of a late Bronze Age settlement on a former eyot were discovered and investigated on the west bank of the Thames. The bridge was designed to avoid disturbing the archaeological site. Near the east bank, close to Mongewell, construction work allowed examination of the South Oxfordshire Grim's Ditch, a long earthwork followed by the Ridgeway Path, and revealed it from the late Iron Age/early Roman.

== See also ==
- Crossings of the River Thames

== Notes ==
Next bridge upstream	River Thames	Next bridge downstream
Wallingford Bridge	Winterbrook Bridge	Moulsford Railway Bridge
