= Chalmore Lock =

Former lock and weir on the River Thames in England

Coordinates: 51°35′42.5″N 1°07′16.5″W

- Interactive map of Chalmore Lock
- Waterway: River Thames
- Country: England
- County: Oxfordshire
- Maintained by: Environment Agency
- First built: 1838
- Fall: 18 inches (460 mm)

Chalmore Lock was a lock and weir which operated between 1838 and 1883 on the River Thames in England near Wallingford, Oxfordshire.

== History ==
Chalmore Lock was built in 1838 by the Thames Navigation Commissioners at a place called Chalmore Hole between Cleeve Lock and Benson Lock. It was built as a summer or low-water lock. For much of the time the lock was open at both ends and the fall was only 18 inches when the water level reached its lowest in summer. It was described at the time of construction as "a weir and two pairs of gates similar to pound gates to pass boats when the weir is shut in". Its usefulness was demonstrated shortly after its construction, when a barge stranded upstream in the shallows was set in motion within five minutes of closing the gates. The lock was provided with a lock keeper and tolls were exacted for its use. However it fell into disrepair, and the Thames Conservancy was anxious to remove it. Nevertheless, from 1874 onwards, the inhabitants of Wallingford campaigned strongly to keep the lock fearing consequences to the town of its removal. In 1881 Thames Conservancy dredged the river below Wallingford Bridge at "enormous cost" and in the winter floating ice swept away much of the weir. In 1883 the lock was finally removed.

== Literature and the media ==
Chalmore Lock gives rise to an anecdote in Three Men in a Boat by Jerome K. Jerome. In it the author recollects an experience of rowing a young lady downstream from Benson Lock expecting to reach "Wallingford Lock" in a short time. Unaware that the map is out of date and that the lock has been removed he and she experience increasing alarm as they continue on the six-mile stretch in the darkening evening to end at Cleeve Lock.

William Staniland included "The lay of Chalmore Lock" among his Songs after Sunset in 1884.

== See also ==
- Locks on the River Thames
