= Cleeve Lock =

Lock on the River Thames in Oxfordshire, England

Coordinates: 51.53193°N 1.13641°W

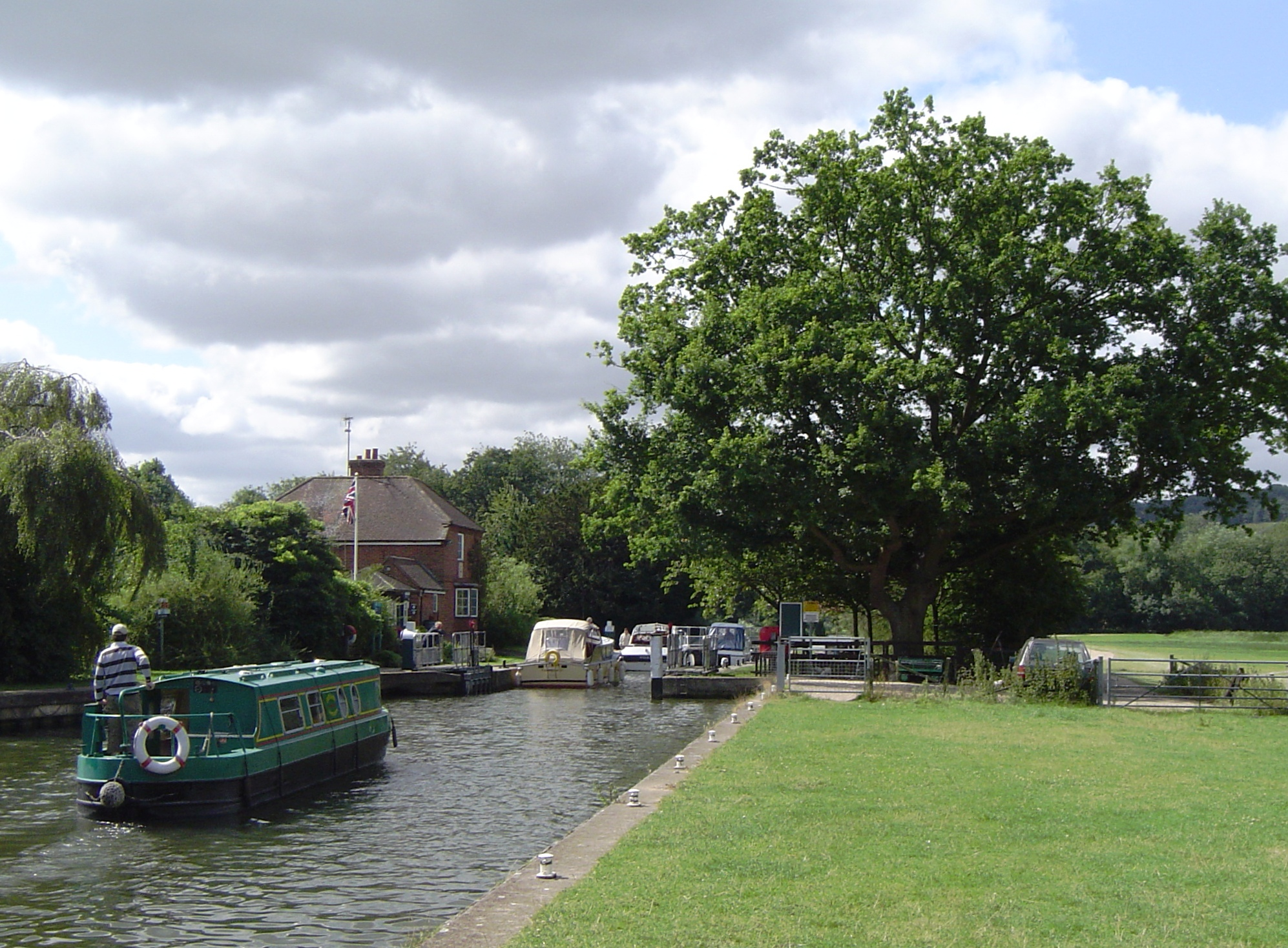
- Cleeve Lock from upstream
- Waterway: River Thames
- County: Oxfordshire
- Maintained by: Environment Agency
- Operation: Hydraulic
- First built: 1787
- Latest built: 1874
- Length: 40.71 m (133 ft 7 in)
- Width: 5.53 m (18 ft 2 in)
- Fall: 0.89 m (2 ft 11 in)
- Above sea level: 138'
- Distance to Teddington Lock: 66 miles
- Power is available out of hours

Cleeve Lock is a lock on the River Thames, in Oxfordshire, England. It is located just upstream of Goring and Streatley villages, on the eastern side of the river within the village of Goring. There was a hamlet of Cleeve, after which the lock is named, but it dropped out of use, as always part of Goring.

The first lock was built in 1787 by the Thames Navigation Commissioners. The reach above the lock is the longest, and the reach below it is the shortest, on the non-tidal river.

The weir runs to an island below the lock, and there are further weirs between islands downstream.

== Access to the lock ==
The lock can be reached on foot from Streatley, or by a track which comes off the A329 road to Wallingford.

== History ==
There was a flash lock recorded on the site in the 16th century. The first pound lock was built of oak in 1787 alongside a meadow which was then known as Winch Meadow. It was originally to be called Streatley Lock, but in the event took its name from the village of Cleeve on the opposite side of the river. Until 1869 Cleeve Lock and Goring Lock were usually operated a single keeper. The lock was rebuilt in 1874.

== Reach above the lock ==
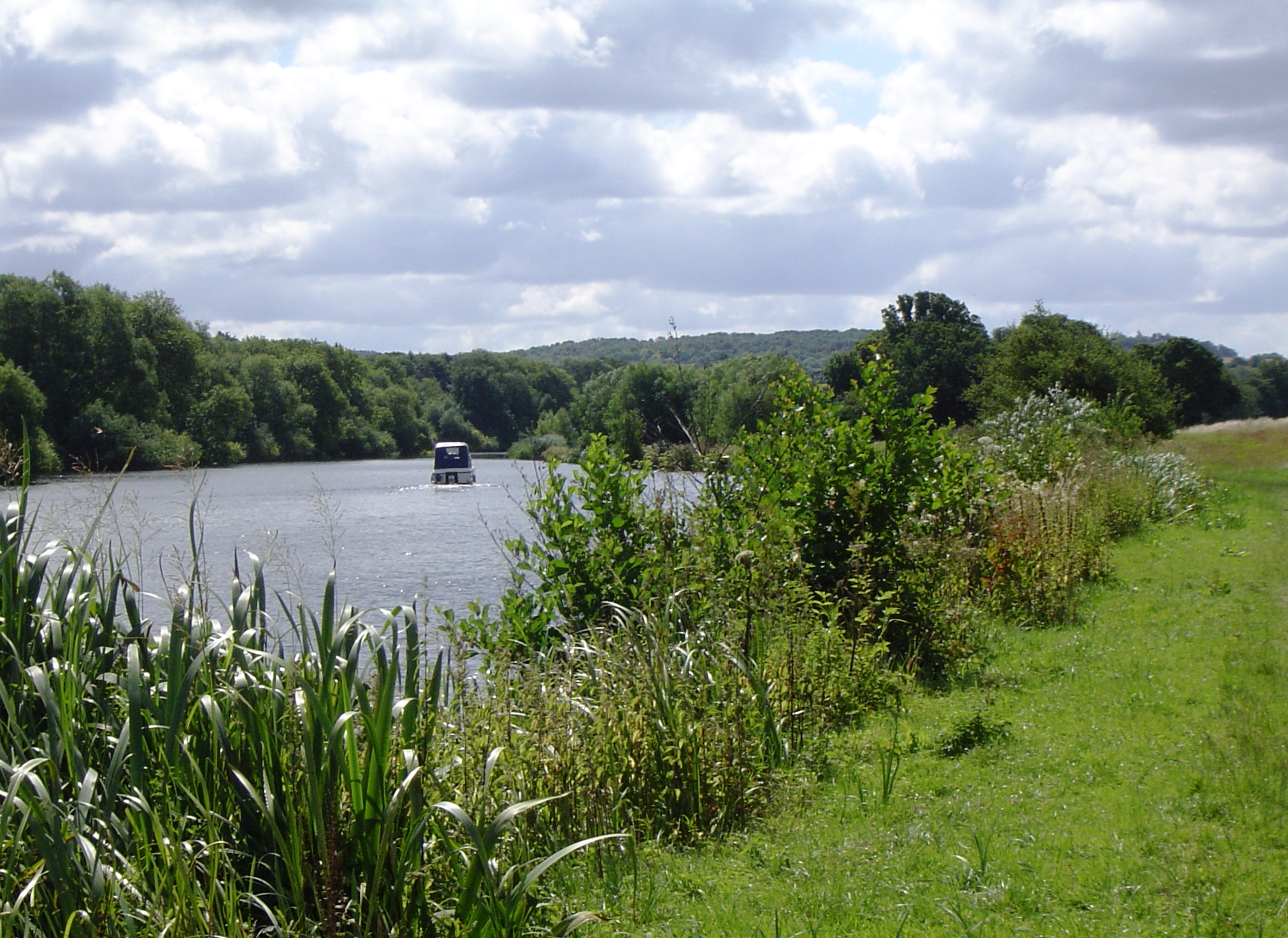
Meadows above Cleeve Lock

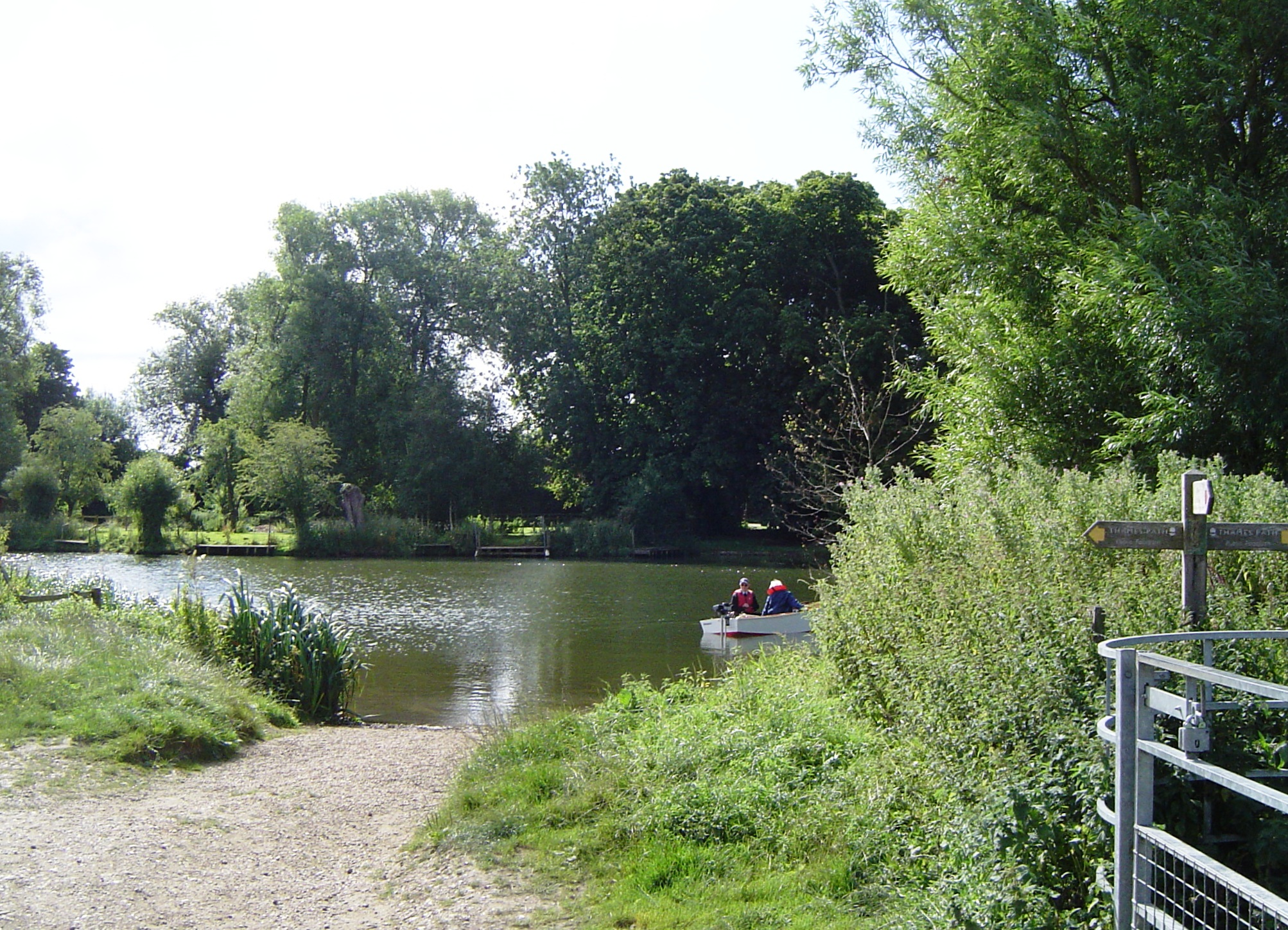
Site of ferry at Little Stoke near Cholsey

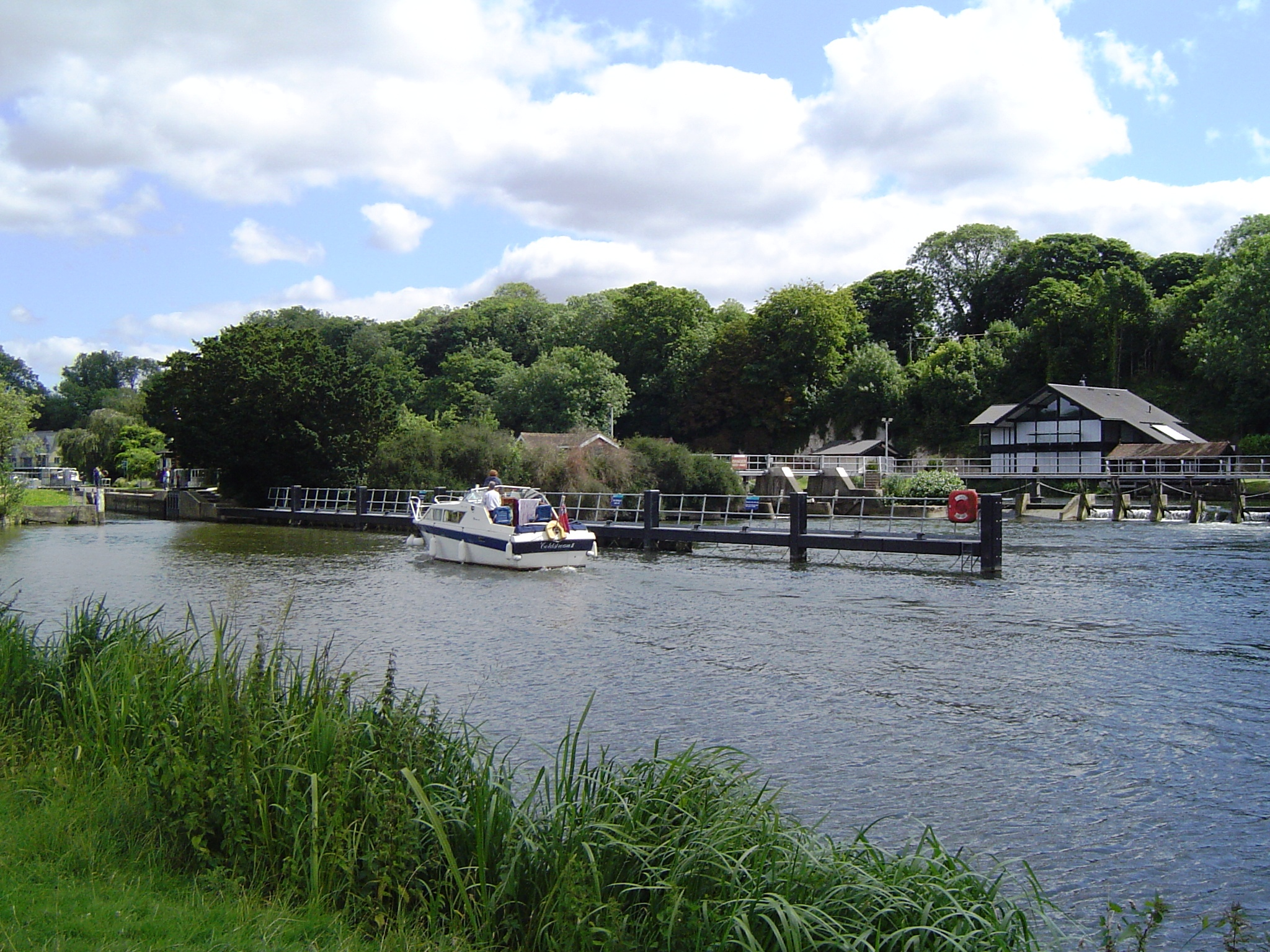
Cleeve Lock and weir from downstream

The six and a half mile reach is the longest on the river. Much of it is open country apart from the small village of Moulsford and the larger town of Wallingford. There were two ferries along the reach at Little Stoke and at Chalmore Hole near Wallingford because the towpath changed sides. Brunel's Moulsford Railway Bridge crosses at some islands near Moulsford, where there was formerly another flash lock. Winterbrook Bridge a new road bridge crosses just downstream of Wallingford, relieving traffic on the ancient multi-arched Wallingford Bridge. There are two historic, interesting venues once purely public houses along the river – these have been turned into expensive restaurants.

The river is an active rowing location with the Oxford University Boat Club and Oxford Brookes University boat club both having club houses on the reach near Wallingford, where Wallingford Rowing Club is also based. The Wallingford Long Distance Sculls take place on the reach in October.

The Thames Path keeps on the western bank all the way, but to compensate for those situations when the towpath changed sides it goes inland at Moulsford following the main road for quite a distance before returning to the river. There is also very small diversion away from the river in Wallingford and then the path stays on the western bank to Benson Lock where it crosses over to the other side of the river. The path is paralleled on the other side of the river as far as Winterbrook Bridge by the Ridgeway.

== Literature and the Media ==
In Jerome K. Jerome's Three Men in a Boat, the narrator recounts a tale of a long and anxious journey down to Cleeve Lock, caused because he had an out of date map showing an intermediate lock at Wallingford. This has a historical basis in fact. Chalmore Lock at Chalmore Hole was established in 1838 (near the current site of the Oxford University Boat Club building), being called a "summer or low-water lock and weir". Although it appears to have been in decline by 1873 the inhabitants of Wallingford petitioned for its retention. It was removed in 1883 after a damning report from Sir John Hawkshaw.

== See also ==
- Locks on the River Thames
- Rowing on the River Thames

Next lock upstream	River Thames	Next lock downstream
Benson Lock; 10.46 km (6.50 mi)	Cleeve Lock; Grid reference: SU600818	Goring Lock; 1.00 km (0.62 mi)
