= Winterbrook House =

Country house in Winterbrook, Oxfordshire

Coordinates: 51°35′30″N 1°07′37″W

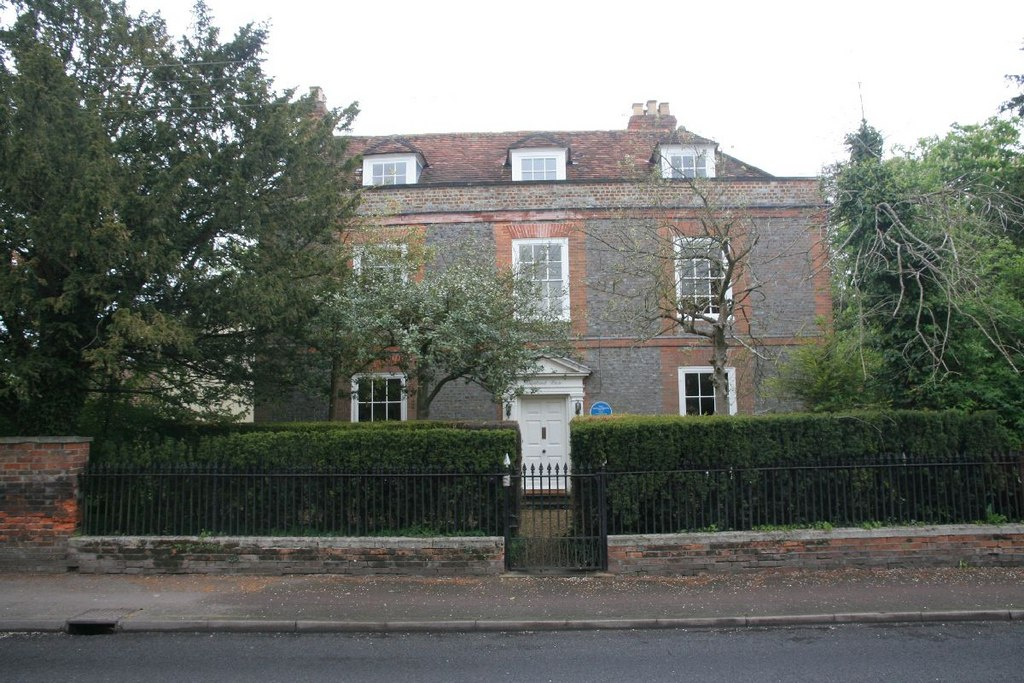
Winterbrook House in 2010

Winterbrook House is a country house in Winterbrook, Oxfordshire.

Agatha Christie purchased the house in 1934, and died there in 1976. The house was Grade II listed in 1986.

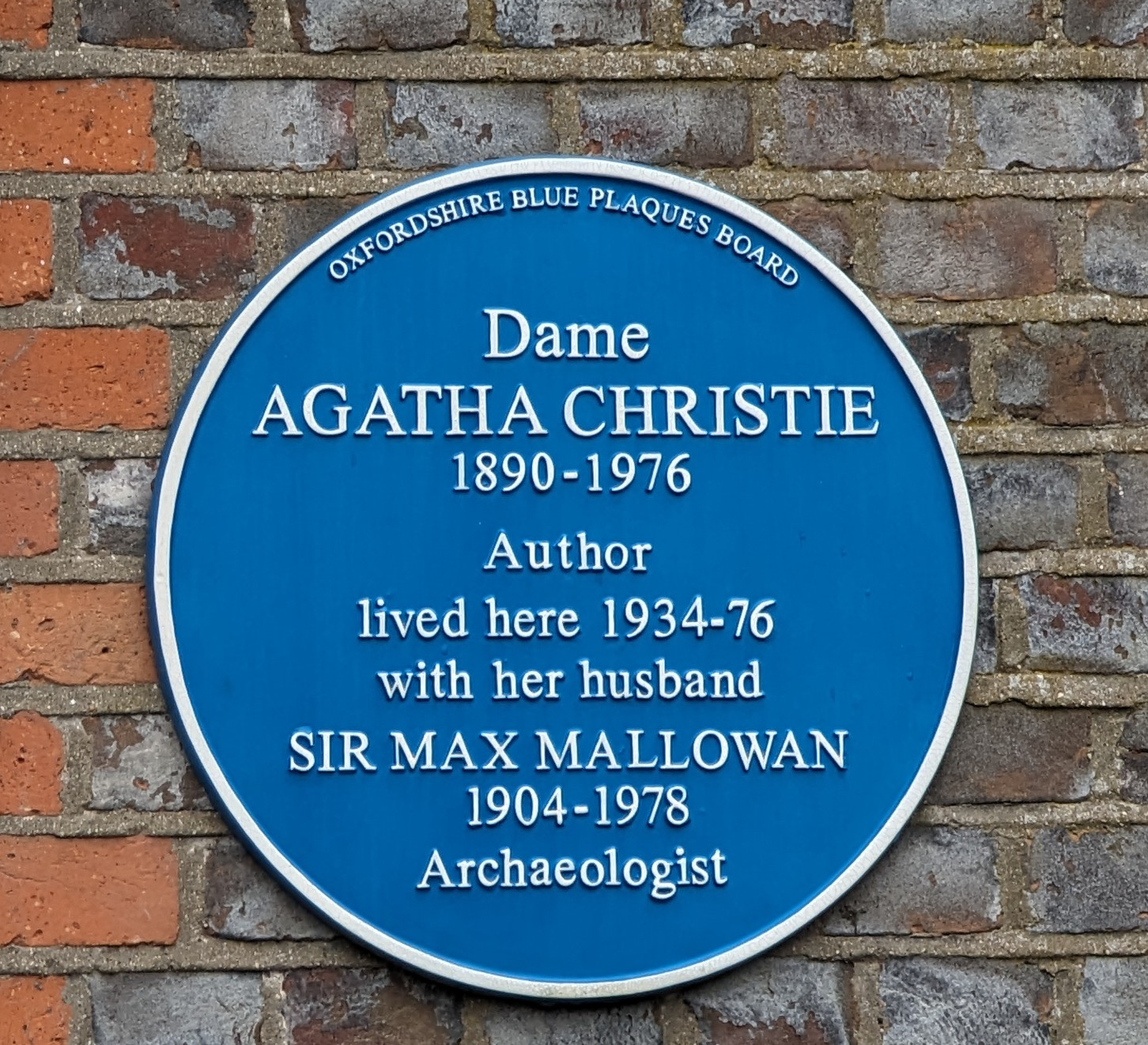
The blue plaque on Winterbrook House

There is a blue plaque on the house by the front door to mark the period of residency of Agatha Christie and her second husband Sir Max Mallowan. The house is privately owned, with large gardens that are also private.
