= Wallingford Bridge =

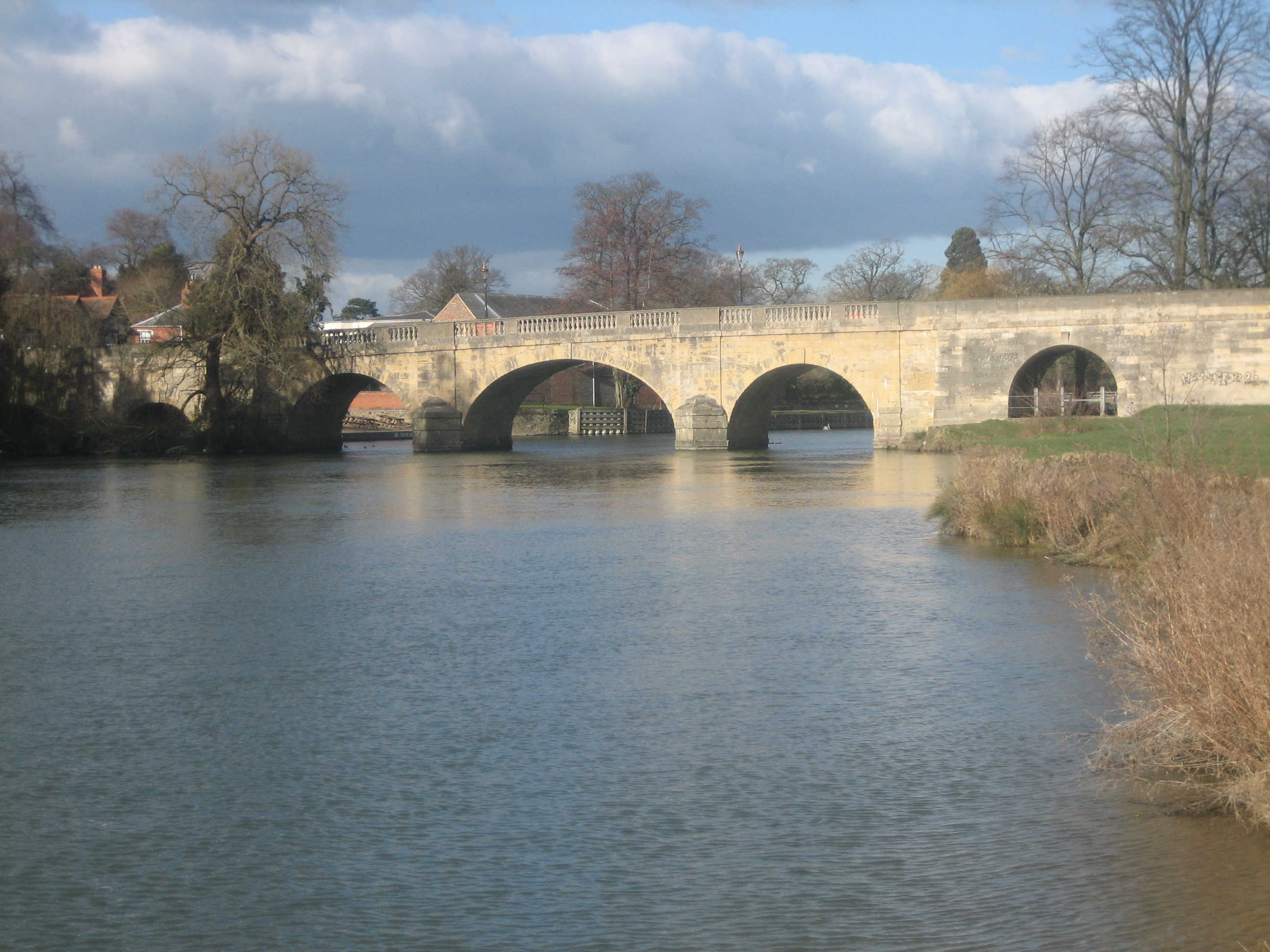
- Wallingford Bridge from downstream
- Coordinates: 51°36′02.5″N 1°07′13.5″W
- Carries: Road
- Crosses: River Thames
- Locale: Wallingford
- Maintained by: Oxfordshire County Council

Characteristics
- Design: arch
- Material: Stone
- Total length: 900 feet (270 m)
- Height: 16 feet 5 inches (5.00 m)
- No. of spans: 19

Location
- Interactive map of Wallingford Bridge

Wallingford Bridge is a medieval road bridge over the River Thames in England which connects Wallingford and Crowmarsh Gifford, Oxfordshire (Wallingford was historically in Berkshire until 1974 reorganization). It crosses the Thames on the reach between Cleeve Lock and Benson Lock. The bridge is 900 feet (270 m) long and has 19 arches. It is a scheduled monument. Since the construction of the southern Wallingford bypass in 1993, most traffic crossing the Thames at the town uses Winterbrook Bridge.

== History ==
The first reference to a bridge across the Thames between Wallingford and Crowmarsh Gifford is from 1141, when King Stephen besieged Wallingford Castle. The first stone bridge is credited to Richard, 1st Earl of Cornwall, and four remaining arches are believed to contain 13th century elements. Major repairs used stone from the dissolved Holy Trinity Priory in 1530. Four arches were removed so a drawbridge could be inserted during the siege of the castle in the Civil War of 1646, and these were replaced with timber structures until repair in 1751. Following a flood, three arches were rebuilt by Richard Clarke from 1810–1812 to a design by John Treacher (1760–1836) developed in 1809, and a parapet and balustrade added.

== Bench marks ==
There are three Ordnance Survey bench marks on the bridge. A cut mark over the centre of the river on the south parapet, another cut mark near the east end of the bridge on the north parapet and a flush bracket numbered 11 used during the second geodetic levelling of England and Wales close to the river bank on the south side of the bridge.

== See also ==
- Crossings of the River Thames

Next bridge upstream	River Thames	Next bridge downstream
Shillingford Bridge	Wallingford Bridge; Grid reference SU6100389468	Winterbrook Bridge
