= Walter Bigg =

English merchant and politician

Walter Bigg (1606 – 5 August 1659) was an English merchant and politician who sat in the House of Commons in 1659.

Bigg was the son of Walter Bigg Senior of Wallingford in Berkshire and Crowmarsh Gifford in Oxfordshire. He lived in the parish of St Giles in the Fields and was a citizen of London and a member of the Worshipful Company of Merchant Taylors. On 6 September 1653 he was elected alderman of the City of London for Castle Baynard ward. He was Sheriff of London in 1654 and Master of the Merchant Taylors for 1654 to 1655. In 1657 he became alderman for Cripplegate ward.

In 1659, Bigg was elected Member of Parliament for Wallingford in the Third Protectorate Parliament. He was the founder of Wallingford School.

His son, John Bigg, was MP for Huntingdon in 1689.

Parliament of England
Preceded by Not represented in Second Protectorate Parliament	Member of Parliament for Wallingford; 1659; With: William Cook	Succeeded by Not represented in restored Rump
