= List of museums in Berkshire =

This list of museums in Berkshire, England contains museums which are defined for this context as institutions (including nonprofit organizations, government entities, and private businesses) that collect and care for objects of cultural, artistic, scientific, or historical interest and make their collections or related exhibits available for public viewing. Also included are non-profit art galleries and university art galleries. Museums that exist only in cyberspace (i.e., virtual museums) are not included.

| Name | Image | Town/City | Region | Type | Summary |
|---|---|---|---|---|---|
| Basildon Park | | Basildon | West Berkshire | Historic house | Operated by the National Trust, 18th century Georgian mansion, gardens, park |
| Berkshire Medical Heritage Centre | | Reading | Reading | Medical | In the 1881 built laundry building of the Royal Berkshire Hospital |
| Cole Museum of Zoology | | Reading | Reading | Natural history | Part of the University of Reading, complete tour of the diversity of the animal kingdom |
| Eton College Natural History Museum | | Eton | Windsor and Maidenhead | Natural history | Part of Eton College, mounted animals, fossils, fish |
| Frogmore House | | Windsor | Windsor and Maidenhead | Historic house | Royal country residence |
| Look Out Discovery Centre | | Bracknell | Bracknell Forest | Science | hands-on science and nature exhibits |
| Maidenhead Heritage Centre | | Maidenhead | Windsor and Maidenhead | Local | Local history, culture |
| Museum of Berkshire Aviation | | Woodley | Wokingham | Aviation | Locally-made aircraft |
| Museum of English Rural Life | | Reading | Reading | Agriculture | Part of the University of Reading, rural history, crafts, farming |
| Museum of Eton Life | | Eton | Windsor and Maidenhead | Education | Part of Eton College, school history, traditions and graduates |
| Museum of Reading | | Reading | Reading | Multiple | Local history, culture, art, Roman artifacts |
| Riverside Museum at Blake's Lock | | Reading | Reading | Multiple | Turbine machinery, gypsy life, art, mill wheel |
| Shaw House | | Shaw | West Berkshire | Historic house | Elizabethan grand house with five unfurnished rooms, exhibits about the house |
| Slough Museum | | Slough | Slough | Local | Local history, culture |
| South Hill Park Arts Centre | | Bracknell | Bracknell Forest | Art | |
| Stanley Spencer Gallery | | Cookham | Windsor and Maidenhead | Art | Works by English painter Sir Stanley Spencer |
| Thames Valley Police Museum | | Sulhamstead | West Berkshire | Law enforcement | Open by appointment |
| Ure Museum of Greek Archaeology | | Reading | Reading | Archaeology | Part of the University of Reading, Greek and Etruscan ceramics and terracottas, Egyptian artifacts |
| West Berkshire Museum | | Newbury | West Berkshire | Local | Local history, culture |
| Windsor and Royal Borough Museum | | Windsor | Windsor and Maidenhead | Local | Local history, culture, formerly the Royal Borough Museum Collection |
| Windsor Castle | | Windsor | Windsor and Maidenhead | Historic house | One of the official residences of the British monarch, includes significant art collection |

== See also ==
- Category:Tourist attractions in Berkshire
