= Holies Down =

Protected area in Berkshire, England

- Site of Special Scientific Interest
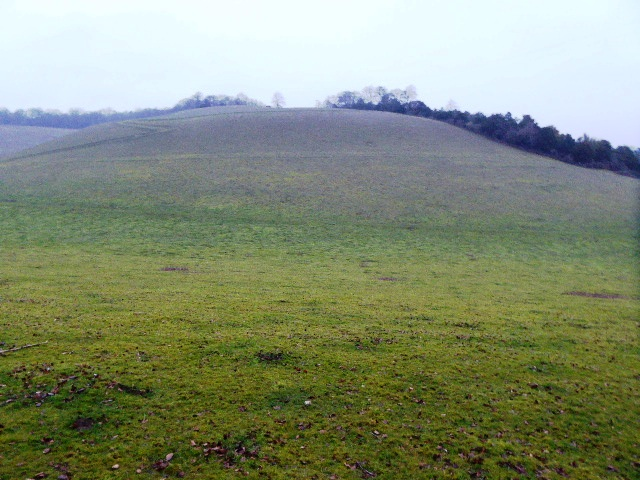

- Location within Berkshire
- Location of Holies Down.
- Area of search: Berkshire
- Grid reference: SU 594 798
- Coordinates: 51.514°N 1.147°W
- Interest: Biological
- Area: 5.6 hectares (14 acres)
- Notification date: 1988
- Location map: Magic Map

Holies Down is a 5.6-hectare (14-acre) biological Site of Special Scientific Interest south of Streatley in Berkshire. It is in the North Wessex Downs, which is an Area of Outstanding Natural Beauty, and is part of the Holies section of the Lardon Chase, the Holies and Lough Down National Trust property.

This sloping site is an area of unimproved chalk grassland in the Berkshire Downs which is maintained by grazing. The turf is mainly composed of glaucous sedge, red fescue, sheep's fescue, quaking grass, yellow oat-grass, upright brome and tor-grass.

There is direct access to Holies Down from the A329 road, or by footpath across the Holies from the National Trust car park at the top of Streatley Hill on the B4009.
