= Waterloo cheese =

English semi-soft cheese

Waterloo
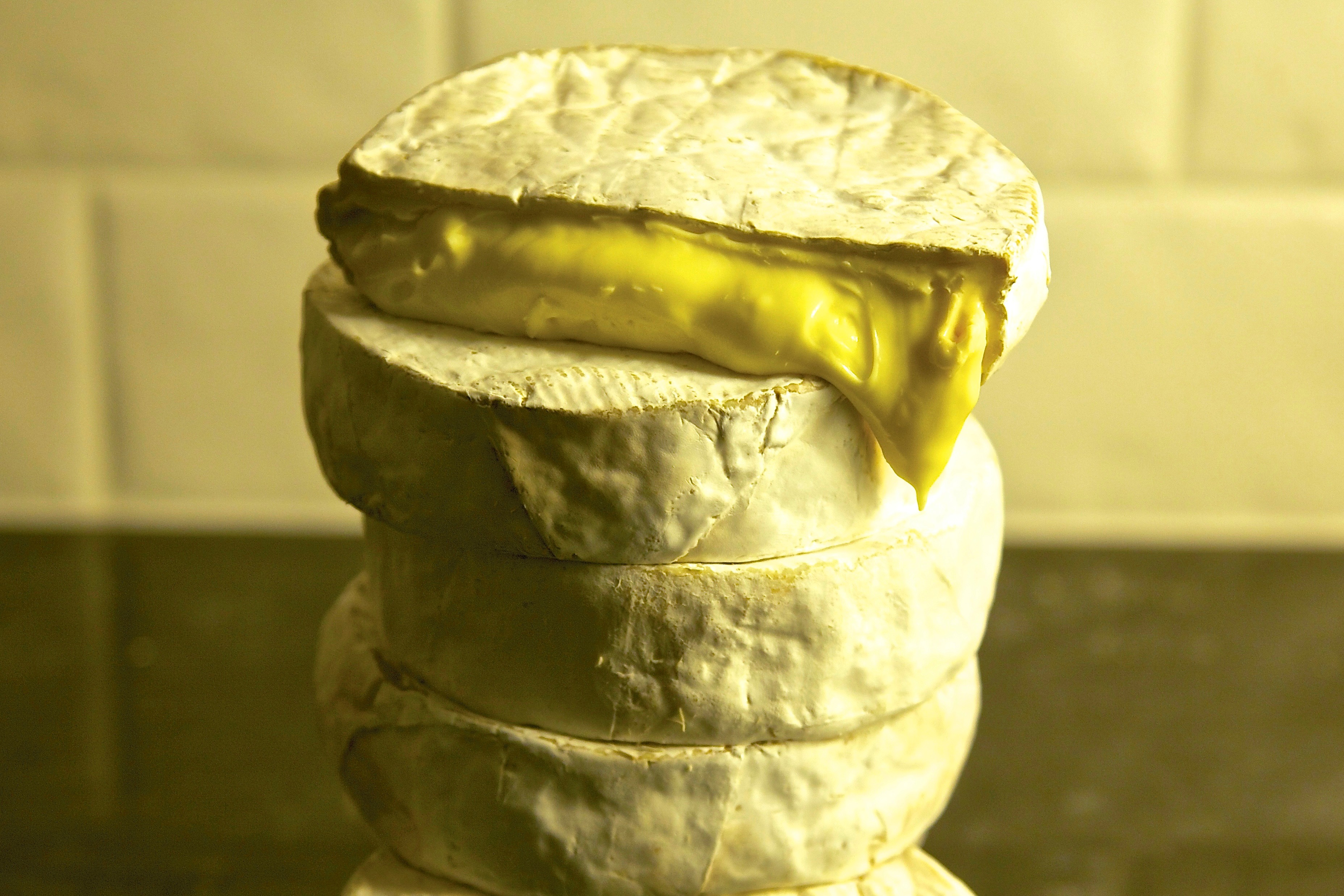
- Country of origin: United Kingdom
- Region: Berkshire
- Town: Riseley
- Source of milk: Guernsey cattle
- Pasteurised: No
- Texture: Semi-soft
- Aging time: 4-10 weeks

Waterloo is a semi-soft, cow's milk cheese produced by Village Maid Cheese Ltd in Riseley, Berkshire.

== Production ==
Similar to brie, the cheese is made from full-fat, unpasteurised Guernsey milk. The affinage period is between 4 and 10 weeks, and the cheese has a fat content of 45%.
