= Lardon Chase, the Holies and Lough Down =

Historic site in Berkshire, England

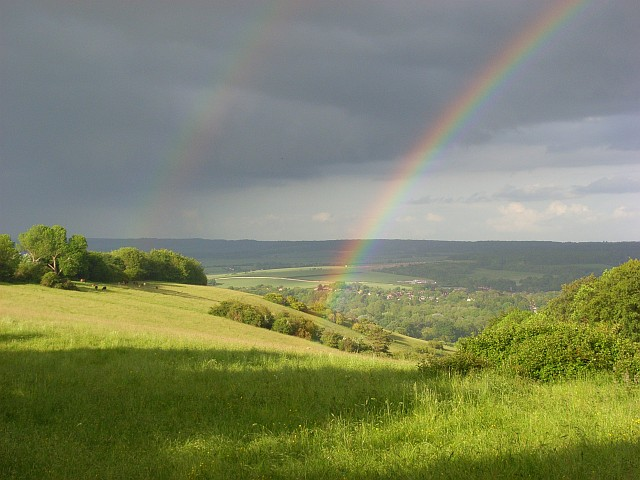
- Lardon Chase, looking north along the Chase from the car park

- Location in Berkshire
- 51.52132°N 1.16112°W
- Location: Berkshire, England
- OS grid reference: SU581806

Lardon Chase, the Holies and Lough Down is a National Trust countryside property in the English county of Berkshire. It is situated on the edge of the Berkshire Downs above the village of Streatley and overlooking the Goring Gap. The property comprises an outstanding area of 27 hectares (67 acres) of downland and woodland with many attractive walks and views. Lardon Chase, and a part of the Holies known as Holies Down, are also designated as Sites of Special Scientific Interest. The property lies within the North Wessex Downs Area of Outstanding Natural Beauty, and in an area known for the presence of several Neolithic and Iron Age forts.

Lardon Chase and Lough Down comprise a spur of downland which lies to the west of Goring and Streatley. Since it was acquired by the National Trust, the land has been managed by a mixture of scrub clearance and cattle grazing, so as to encourage the growth of chalk-loving plants. The Holies is a woodland fringed grassy coombe which is separated from Lardon Chase and Lough Down by the B4009 road from Streatley to Newbury. Before acquisition by the National Trust, the Holies was used for motorbike scrambling and turf stripping, resulting in considerable damage to the ground. The National Trust is encouraging the natural recolonisation of the area by chalk-loving plant species. There are three turf mazes in the Holies.

The slopes of the property form one of the largest remaining areas of chalk grassland in the county and support a wide range of flowers and butterflies. Plants found in the grassland include autumn gentian, clustered bellflower, blue fleabane, vervain, common rock-rose, horseshoe vetch, kidney vetch, marjoram, yellow-wort, purging flax, wild carrot, chalk milkwort, stemless thistle, eyebright, mouse-ear hawkweed, salad burnet, ragwort, wild thyme, hairy violet, squinancywort, hawkweed ox-tongue, common spotted orchid and pyramidal orchid. Scattered bands of hawthorn scrub provide shelter for insect life and several butterfly species can be found, including chalkhill blue, marbled white, adonis blue, grizzled skipper and dingy skipper.

The property is accessible from a car park located on the B4009, or by steeply climbing footpaths from Streatley village. The Holies is also accessible (on foot only) from the A329 road south of Streatley, whilst Lough Down can be accessed from the ancient track of The Ridgeway on its northern boundary. Access is free, and available at all times. The property adjoins the Goring & Streatley Golf Club.

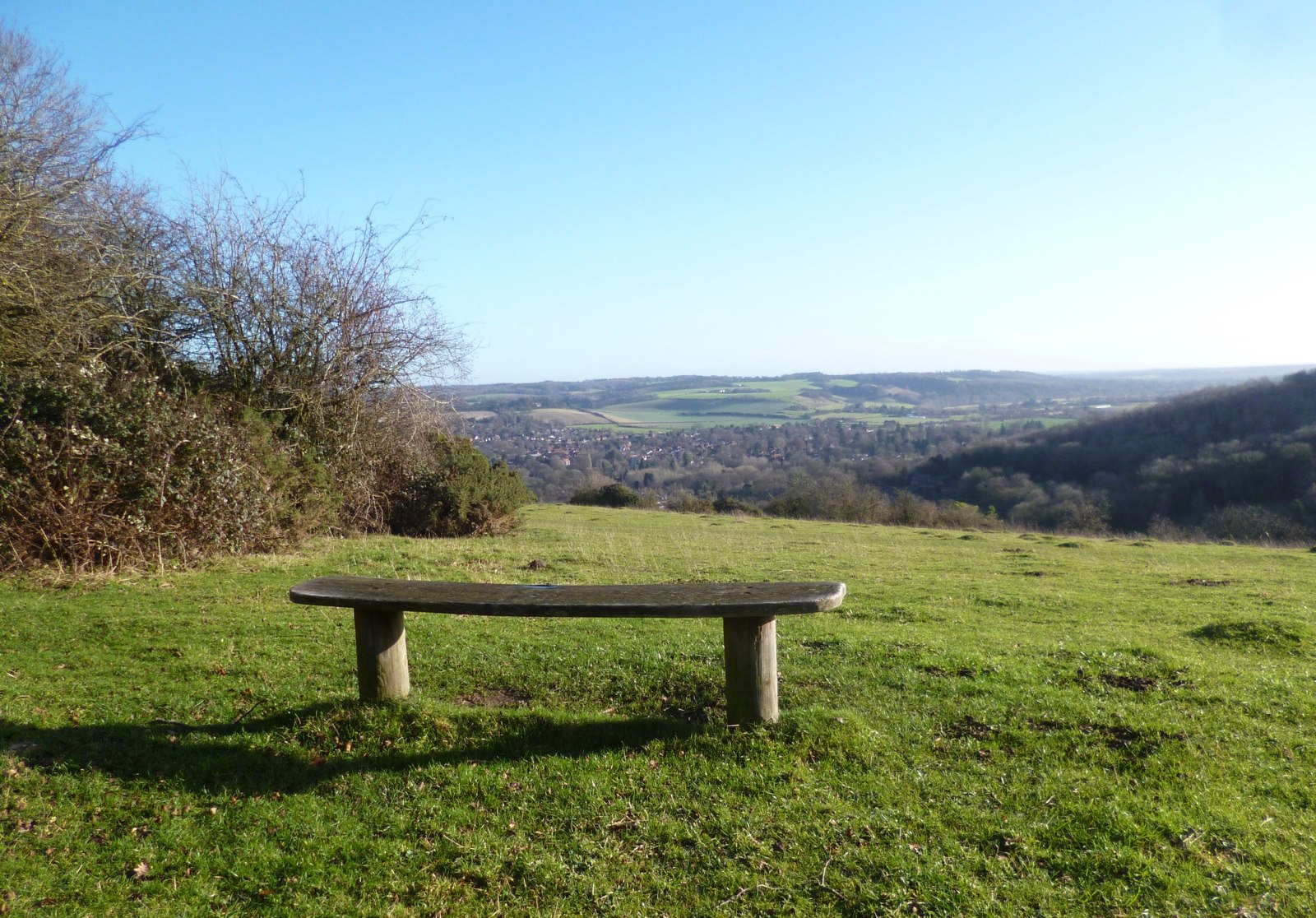
Looking down the Thames Valley from Lardon Chase

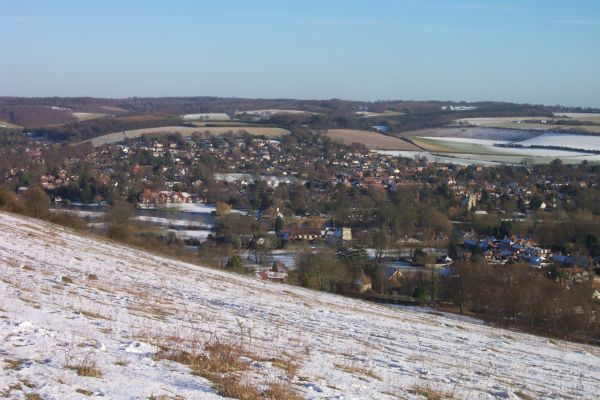
The Goring Gap seen from Lardon Chase on a snowy January day

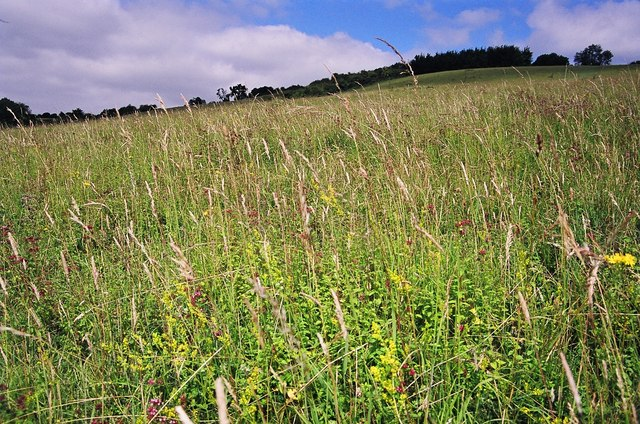
Lough Down

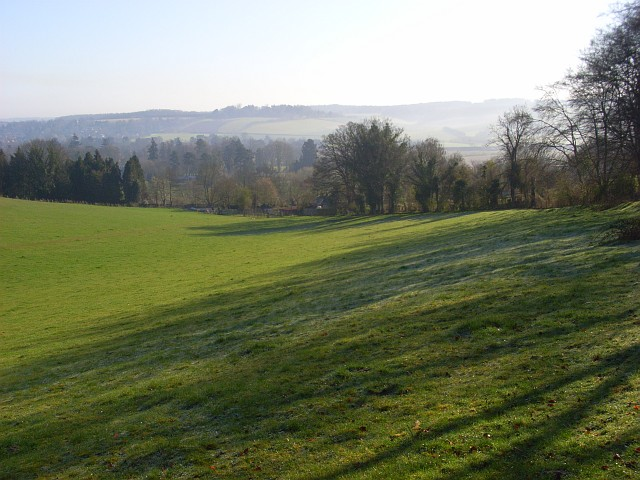
The Holies, looking across to the Chiltern Hills
