= Riverside Museum at Blake's Lock =

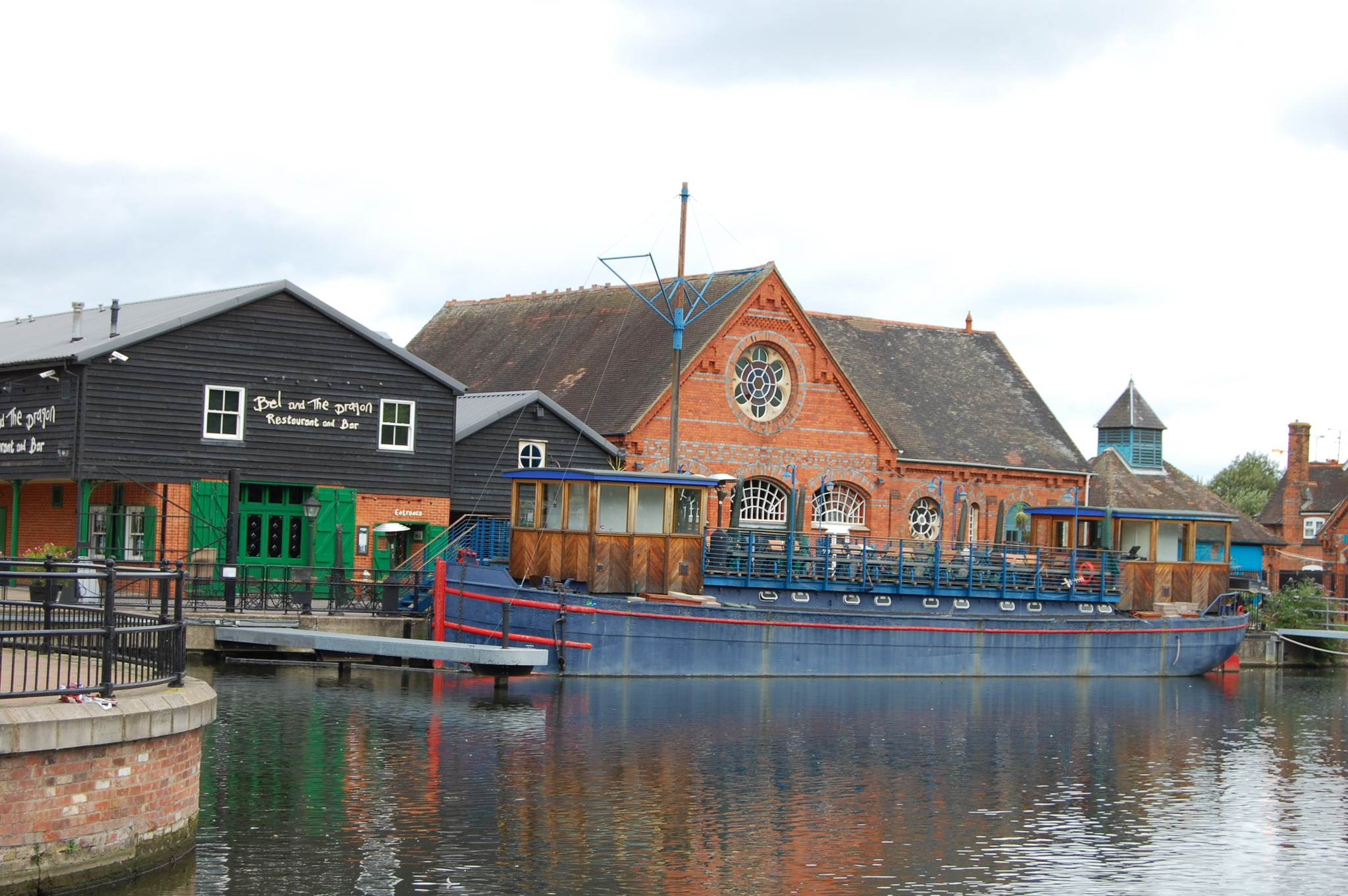

- Location within Reading
- Location: Reading, Berkshire, England
- Coordinates: 51.455765°N 0.958546°W
- Type: Local museum
- Website: Riverside Museum at Blake's Lock

Riverside Museum at Blake's Lock is a museum located at Blake's Lock in the town of Reading, in Berkshire, England. The museum contains information about the history of human activity on the River Kennet and the River Thames in Reading.

The museum is located in two historical buildings: the Screen House and the Turbine House. Exhibits include information about Romani people, examples of medieval uses of the river, and temporary art exhibits. Although the museum is located on the River Kennet, it is on the short reach of the river near its junction with the River Thames that is administered by the Environment Agency as part of the Thames.
