= Goring Gap =

River Thames valley in south east England

Coordinates: 51°31′23″N 01°08′30″W

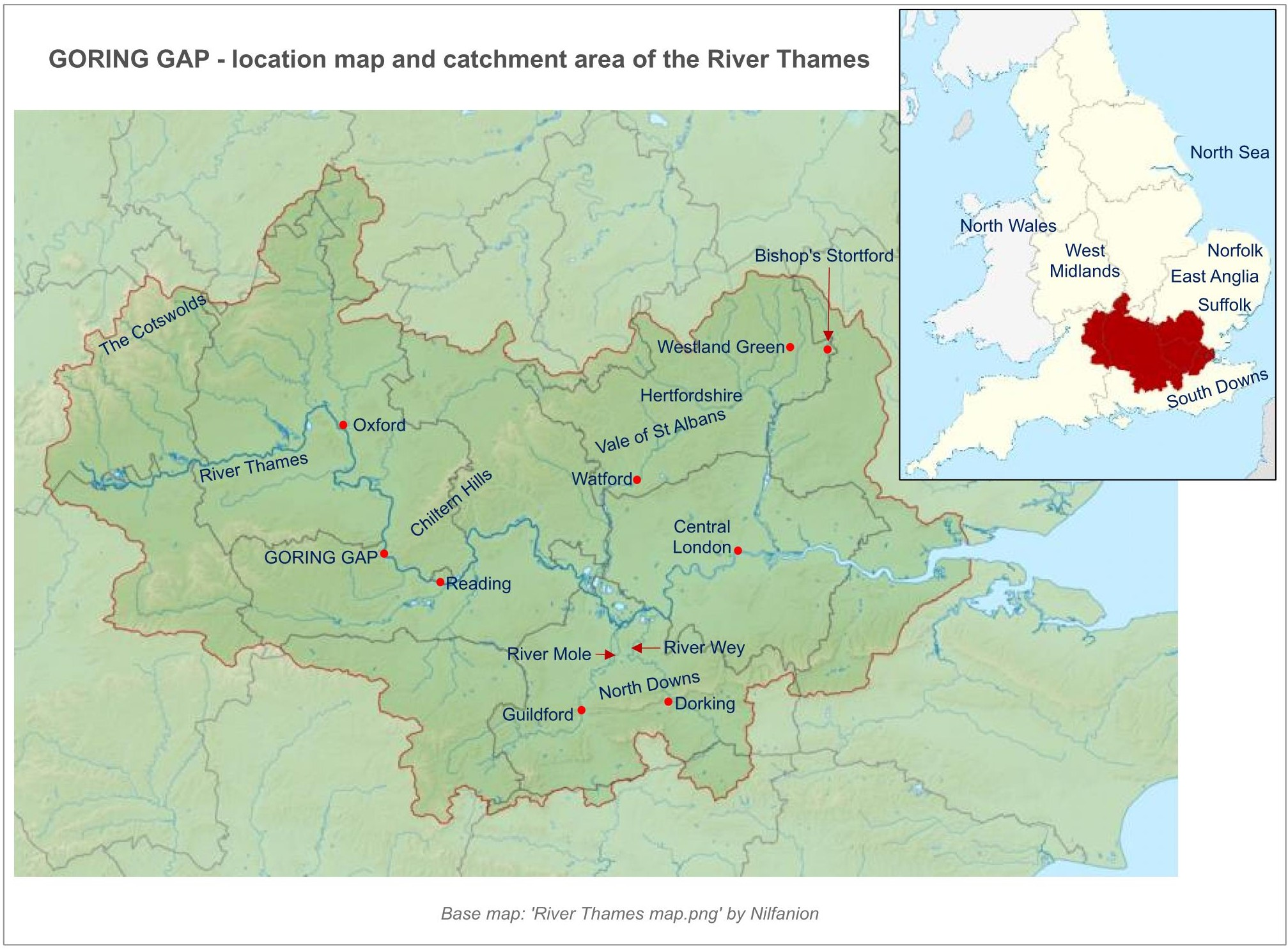
River Thames catchment area

The Goring Gap is a topographical feature on the course of the River Thames. The Gap is located in southern England where the river, flowing from north to south, cuts through and crosses a line of chalk hills in a relatively narrow gap between the Chiltern Hills and the Berkshire Downs. The Gap is approximately 10 miles (16 km) upstream of Reading and 27 miles (43 km) downstream of Oxford. The Gap is named after the town of Goring-on-Thames in Oxfordshire. That town is on the east bank of the river at Goring Gap, and Streatley (in Berkshire) is immediately opposite, on the west bank.

At Goring Gap, the Thames is at an altitude of about 45 metres (148 ft). The ground rises steeply on either side, reaching 100 metres (330 ft) within a kilometre to the east and west, and continuing to higher ground at around 160 metres (520 ft).

The Chalk beds have proved to be relatively more resistant to erosion than adjacent geological formations, so the relief of land to the north and south-east of the Gap is less marked. In particular, there is a low-lying Gault clay vale either side of Dorchester (to the north), and a broad, low-lying London Clay zone in the London Basin beyond Reading (to the south-east).

Although this configuration - of a major river slicing through chalk hills, with extensive areas of lower-lying land on either side - is not found elsewhere in the Chiltern Hills, it is found at a number of locations in the North Downs and South Downs; for example, where the North Downs are crossed by the River Wey at Guildford, and by the River Mole near Dorking.

== Formation ==
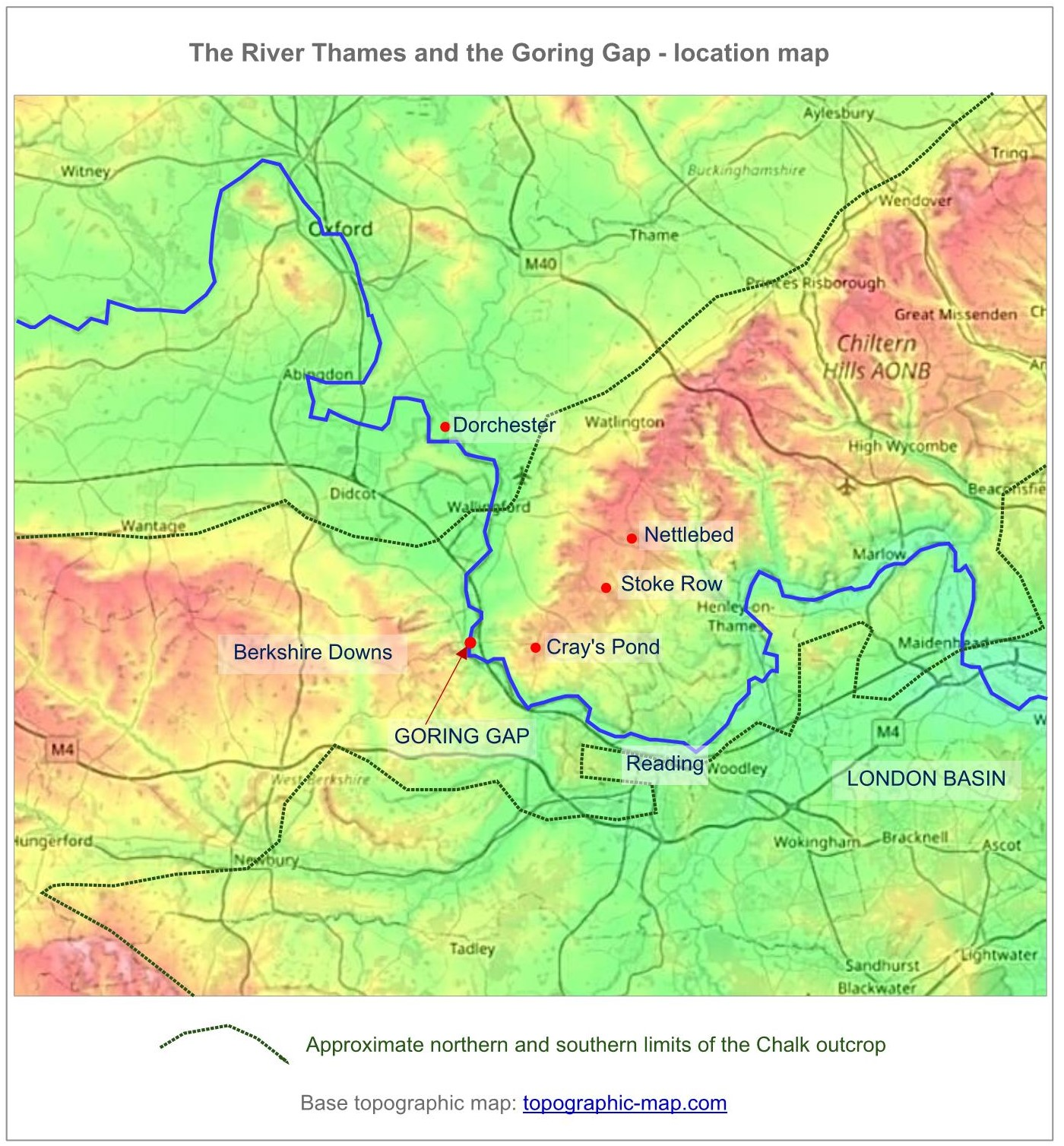
Goring Gap location map

The River Thames has its origins in the emergence of Britain from a Cretaceous sea over 60 million years ago. During the latter part of the Cretaceous period, sea level is thought to have been over 150 metres (490 ft) higher than today. Much of the land which was later to form Britain was covered by sea. In this marine environment, thick deposits of Chalk were laid down.

From the early Paleocene (from around 65 million years ago), much of what is now Britain emerged above sea level. The maximum uplift occurred in the north-west, with a regional tilt towards the east and south-east. The North Sea basin also developed.

The drainage of much of England was thus aligned to the south-east. As the land emerged from beneath the Cretaceous sea, precursors of some of today's major drainage systems of central, eastern and southern England developed. Thus, from the early Tertiary period a number of major consequent rivers flowed approximately NW-SE down the tilted emergent Chalk surface towards what later became southern England.

One of those early watercourses was the Ancestral Thames. However, the course of the river prior to the Pleistocene epoch is not known exactly. The geological beds over which it flowed (including Chalk beds which formerly covered much of central, northern and western Britain), and any deposits which the river may have left, have all been removed by erosion.

However, it is known with some certainty that the Thames has been flowing close to where the Goring Gap is now situated from at least Early Pleistocene times - that is, for at least one million years, and probably for rather longer. This is because a deposit of "variably sandy and clayey gravel", which is known to have been laid down by the Thames, has been found on hilltops close to Goring Gap. This deposit, known as Westland Green Gravel, lies on land at a today's altitude of about 160 metres (520 ft) at Cray's Pond (about 3 kilometres (1.9 mi) east of Goring), and at the top of Streatley Hill (about 1 kilometre (0.62 mi) west of today's Thames). It is believed that that deposit was laid down by the Thames approximately 1.6 million years ago.

(It is possible that, at a slightly earlier time (on a geological scale), the Thames may have been flowing on a course a little to the north-east of Goring Gap - that is, through Stoke Row, where deposits laid down by the Thames and resting today at a somewhat higher altitude (over 170 metres (560 ft) have been identified. The outcrops of Thames gravel there are relatively isolated, and the line which the river was taking at that time is not entirely clear. But if the Thames did enter the London Basin in the vicinity of Stoke Row at that time, it would then have moved south-westwards to Goring Gap over a period of about a hundred thousand years or more, prior to the deposit of the Westland Green Gravel.)

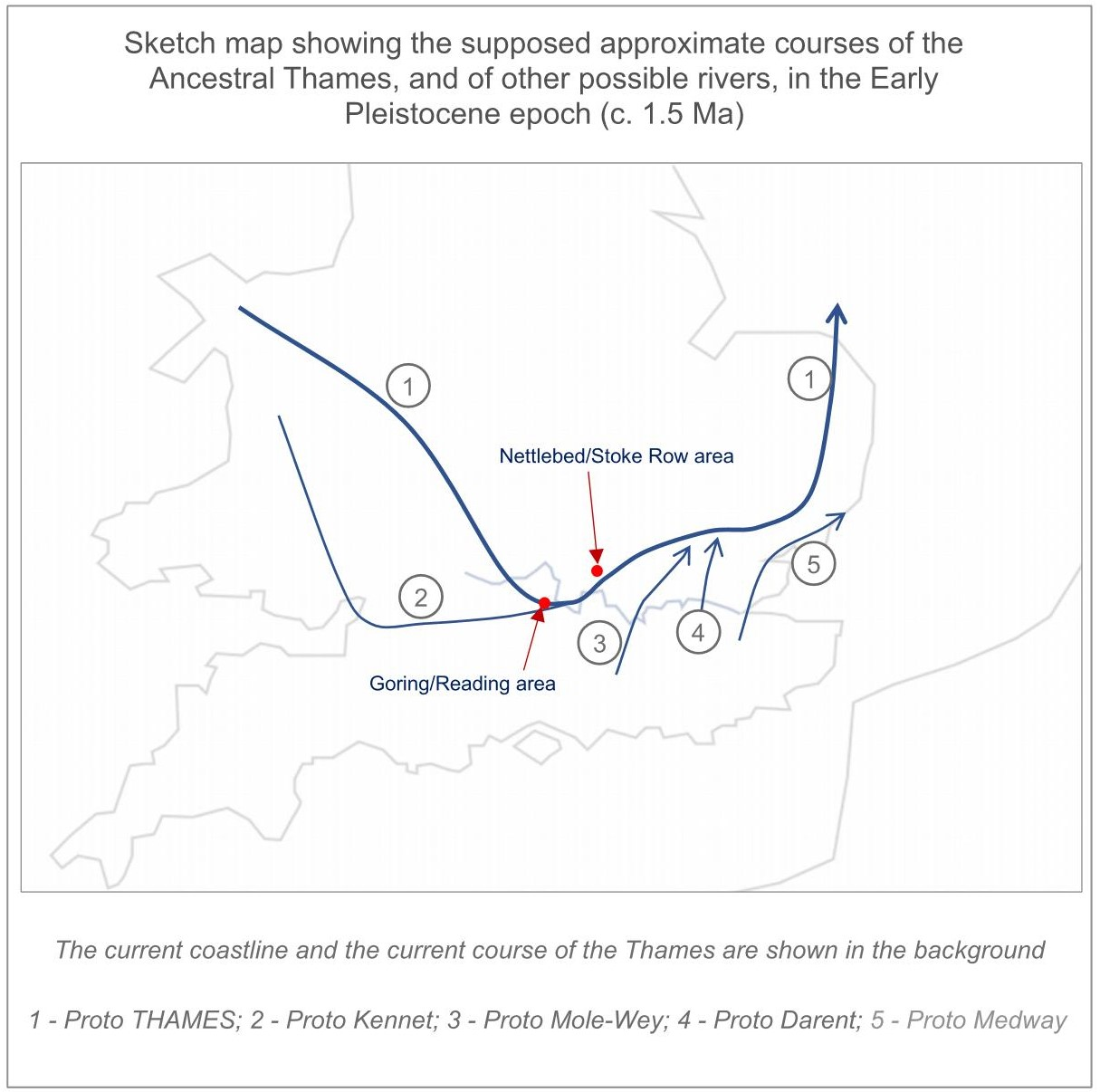
Ancestral Thames - Early Pleistocene.

The Stoke Row Gravel and the Westland Green Gravel are known to have been deposited by a major watercourse because they contain far-travelled materials, such as quartz and quartzite from Triassic and earlier formations of the West Midlands, and volcanic rocks from northern Wales. Moreover, the Westland Green Gravel continues beyond Goring Gap, north-eastwards across Hertfordshire and into East Anglia. A watercourse of such magnitude could only have been a precursor of today's River Thames.

The extent and course of the Thames have changed considerably in certain places during the past 1.5 million years. In particular, the Thames lost its headwaters north of the Cotswolds - possibly as a result of the Anglian glaciation about 450,000 years ago. That glaciation was certainly responsible for a major change in the river's course in the London Basin, where the ice advance to Watford forced the river, which had formerly flowed along the line of the Vale of St Albans, to take a more southerly course towards the North Sea, approximately along its present line.

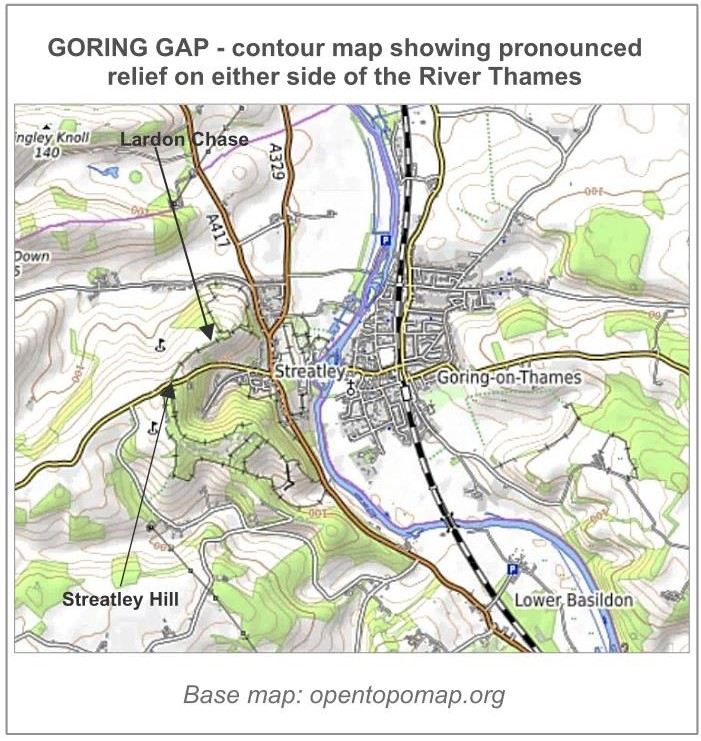
Goring Gap - contour map

However, the course of the Thames in the vicinity of Goring Gap has stayed much the same during the past 1.5 million years. Deposits laid down by the Thames which are younger than the Westland Green Gravel are found on hillsides close to today's Thames in a zone running from Goring Gap to Reading, with their altitude becoming lower as the deposits become younger. And ice sheets from the north never reached as far south as Goring, so they did not disrupt the river's course here as they did elsewhere. The river at Goring Gap has simply cut down progressively to its current altitude. During that time, the relief in the vicinity of Goring Gap, as elsewhere in many parts of Britain, has become progressively more pronounced, especially at times during the Quaternary of "high discharge, under cold climatic conditions".

== Communications ==
The Goring Gap forms an important communications and transportation corridor. Besides the river itself, which is now limited to navigation for leisure purposes, the gap accommodates the A329 road linking Reading and Oxford, along with the Great Western Main Line railway from London to Bristol and South Wales.

The Thames Path local section between Reading and Oxford, and the Ridgeway (local successor to the Icknield Way) cross the Thames here.

== Gallery ==
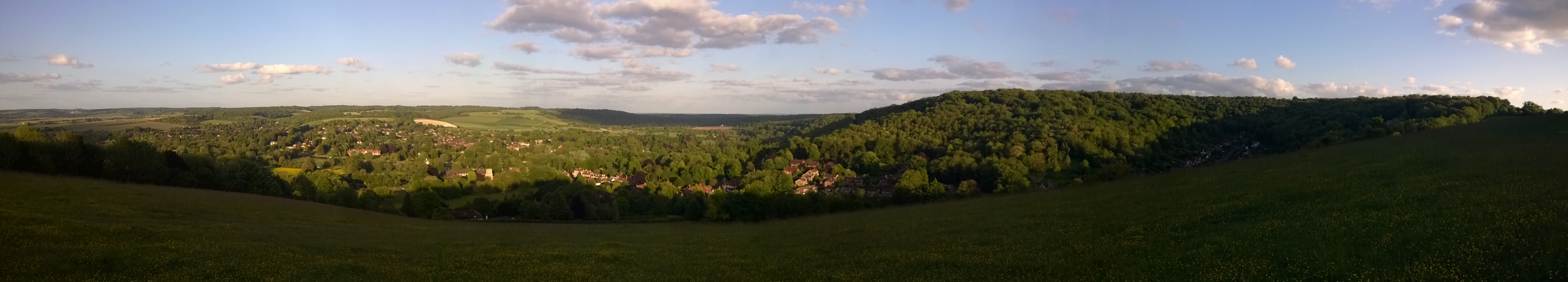
The Goring Gap on a summer's evening from Lardon Chase
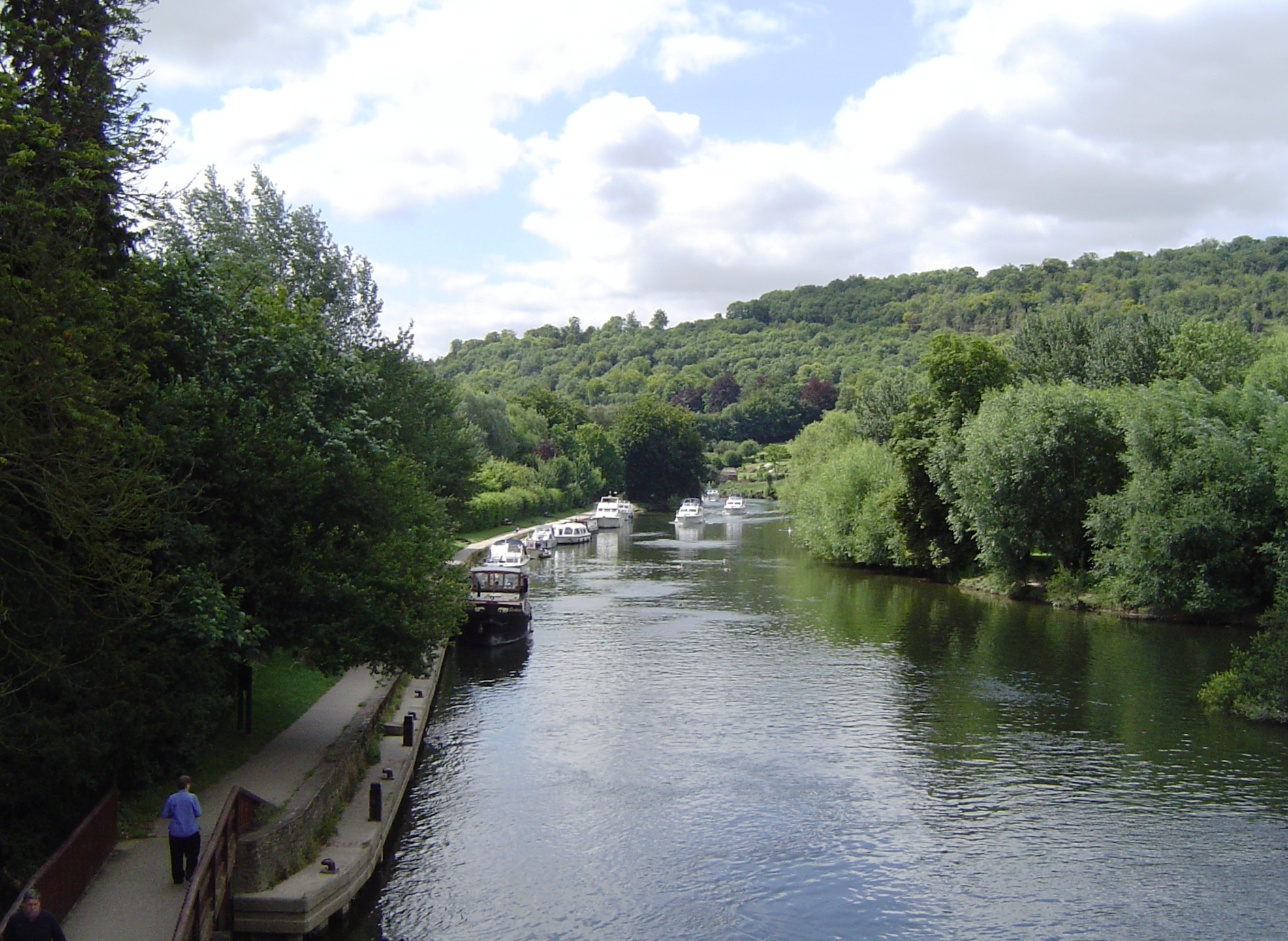
A tree-lined part of the Thames in the Goring Gap.

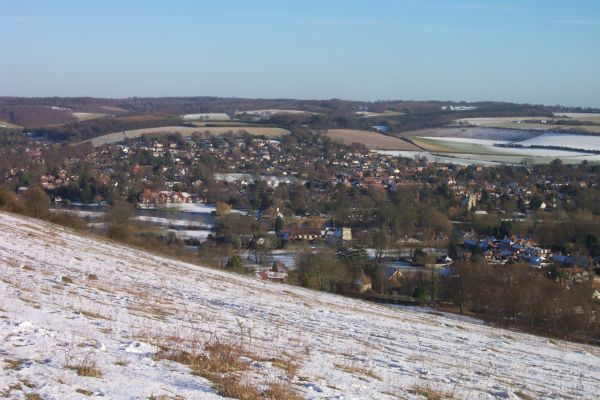
The river and gap seen from Lardon Chase on a snowy January day, with the Chilterns in the background
