= Lardon Chase =

Site of special scientific interest and national trust property in Berkshire, England

- Site of Special Scientific Interest
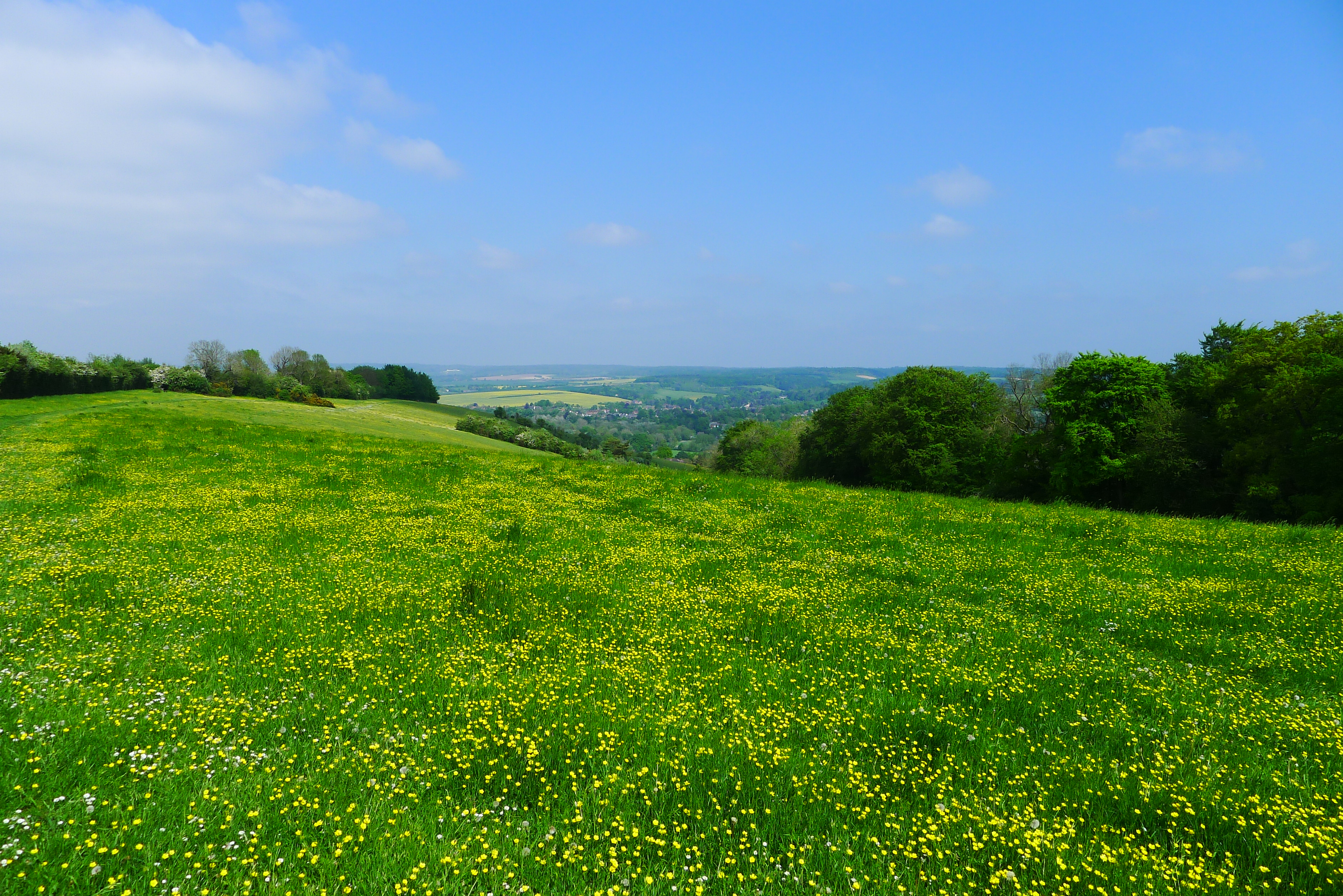

- Location within Berkshire
- Location of Lardon Chase.
- Area of search: Berkshire
- Grid reference: SU 587 809
- Coordinates: 51.523°N 1.155°W
- Interest: Biological
- Area: 14.9 hectares (37 acres)
- Notification date: 1983
- Location map: Magic Map

Lardon Chase is a 14.9-hectare (37-acre) biological Site of Special Scientific Interest near Streatley in Berkshire. Bordering Oxfordshire, It is in the North Wessex Downs, which is an Area of Outstanding Natural Beauty, and is part of the Lardon Chase, the Holies and Lough Down National Trust property.

This sloping site on the Berkshire Downs is unimproved chalk grassland. Steep areas on thin soils are grazed by rabbits. The site is particularly important for its butterfly species, including chalkhill blue, marbled white and the rare adonis blue at its last known locality in the county.

There is access from Streatley Hill.
