= James Towillis =

British landscape artist

James Towillis is an English landscape artist. He won a Silver Gilt at the Chelsea Flower Show of the Royal Horticultural Society in 2010, with the L’Occitane Garden.

== Early life and education ==
He was born in Berkshire and spent his early life there before moving to the Lake District where “his lifelong passion for gardens and landscape took root”. Spending “almost every weekend and holiday camping, walking, climbing and sailing in the Lake District and beyond” he went on to study Outdoor Education at Newbury College, before working in outdoor centres across the UK, which he practiced for six years.

== Career ==
Whilst travelling in the U.S he met with Amazon Watch, an environmental NGO focusing on the South American rainforests and its indigenous tribes. Their mission resonated with him immediately which led him to volunteer his skills as an activist. James went on to work with Greenpeace Hong Kong for two years as their Action Coordinator.

Returning to the UK by land James Towillis spent many months exploring China, Tibet and Mongolia. On returning to the UK, he “continued exploring the landscape and seascapes of Cornwall through walking, surfing and painting”. After a winter snowboarding in the Alps James returned to the UK to work for Whichford Pottery in Warwickshire where he gained his first taste of Chelsea Flower Show by helping to build their display stands.

He then set up urbanware in 2004 - a company specialising in urban garden design, bespoke planters and garden furniture, whilst also studying garden design at Pershore College. He has exhibited at Urban Gardens, 100%Design, Grand Designs Live, Pulse, the Chelsea Flower Show 2008 (Silver Flora) and, most recently, the L'Occitane Garden at Chelsea Flower Show 2010 winning Silver Gilt.

James has worked with a number of other garden designers, architects and private clients – his work has also featured in many mainstream magazines and newspapers as well as the BBC.
