= Comptel =

Finland-based software company

Comptel Corporation
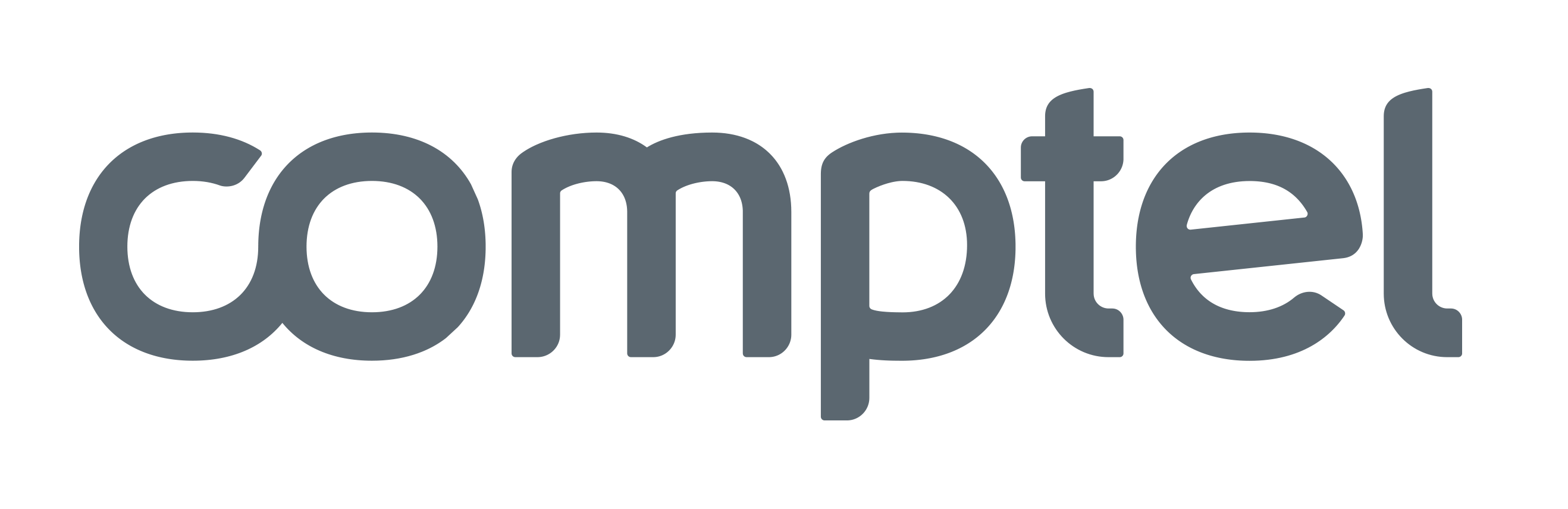
- Company type: Public (NASDAQ OMX Helsinki: CTL1V)
- Industry: Telecommunications Software
- Headquarters: Helsinki, Finland
- Area served: Worldwide
- Number of employees: 750+
- Website: www.comptel.com

Comptel Corporation was an international software company specialising in telecommunications. Nokia acquired Comptel in 2017 to merge it as a part of its Nokia Software business unit.

== History ==
Comptel was founded in Helsinki, Finland in 1986; the trade register entry was made on June 30. Initially the company was a system development and IT subsidiary of Helsinki Telephone Association. Comptel was listed on NASDAQ OMX Helsinki in 1999 under the code CTL1V.

In 2005, Comptel acquired EDB Telecom, a telecom subsidiary of a Norwegian IT company EDB Business Partner, and in 2008, Axiom Systems, a UK-based software product company that focused on the broadband fulfilment market.

Before the acquisition by Nokia, Comptel operated globally in the developing Operations Support Systems (OSS) market for telecommunications and had offices in 20 locations. Comptel employed about 750 people. Major hubs were in Helsinki, Kuala Lumpur in Malaysia, Lysaker in Norway and Reading, UK. Comptel’s OSS product portfolio consisted of mediation, charging, policy control, fulfilment and provisioning and activation.

On February 9, 2017, Nokia announced that it would acquire Comptel. The acquisition was completed on June 29, 2017.
