= West Berkshire Museum =

Museum in Newbury, Berkshire, England

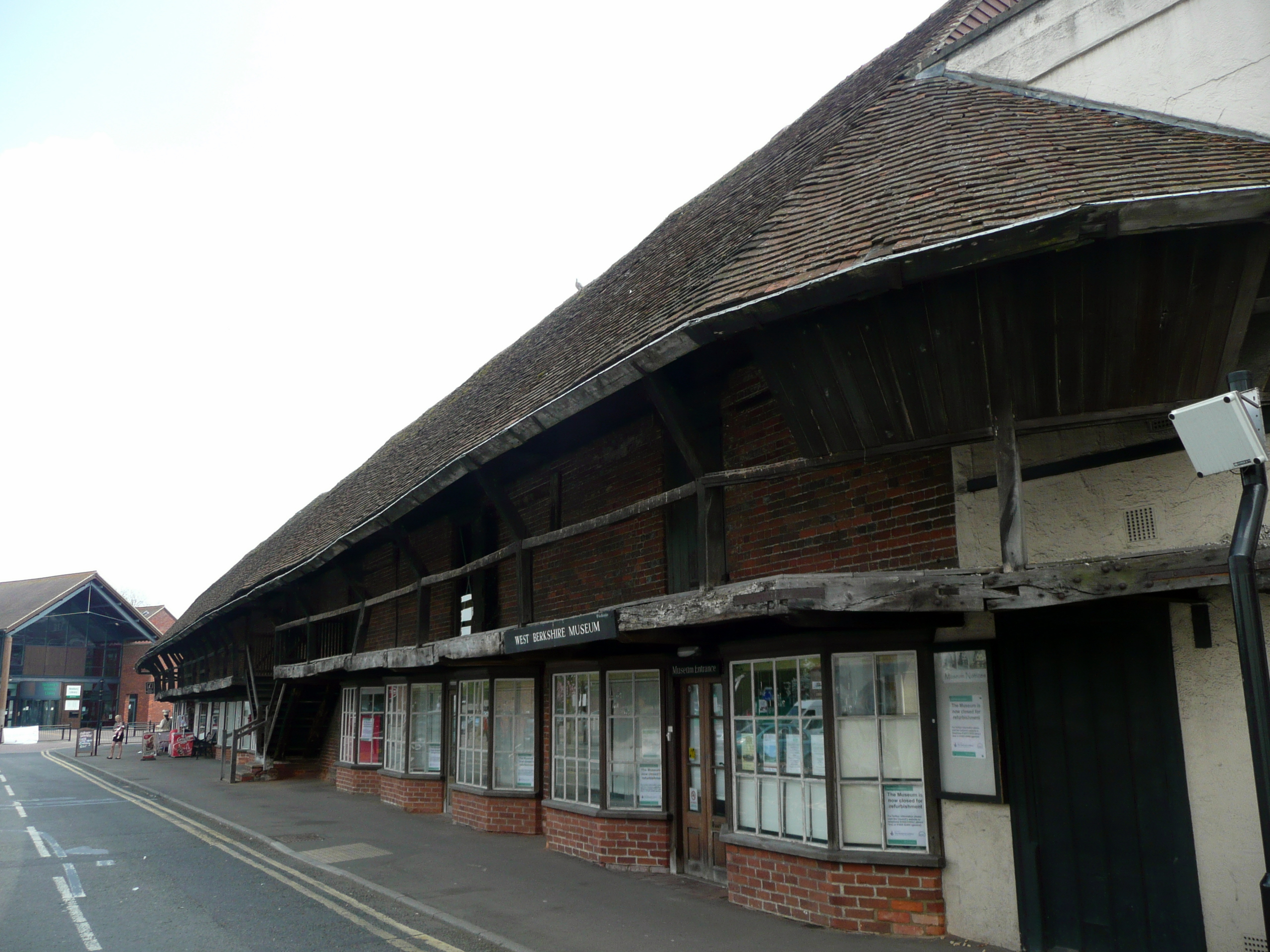
- West Berkshire Museum (The Granary) in 2011, prior to renovation
- Established: 26 October 1904
- Location: Newbury, Berkshire
- Coordinates: 51.401337°N 1.321743°W
- Collection size: 38,000
- Website: www.westberkshireheritage.org/west-berkshire-museum

The West Berkshire Museum, in Newbury, Berkshire, holds various artworks and collections related to Newbury and West Berkshire. Established in 1904, the museum is housed in two of Newbury's most historic buildings. The Cloth Hall was built in 1627 by Richard Emmes, a master carpenter of Speenhamland for the Newbury Corporation as a cloth factory. Originally part of a larger range of buildings with a courtyard in the centre, the building was subsequently used as a workhouse, hospital and school before being used for storing corn from 1829 until its conversion to a museum.

The museum itself has exhibition galleries, café and a local history library, along with a Conference room which can be hired.

A permanent exhibition tells the story of West Berkshire. From the geology to the stories of people who have lived in West Berkshire; early ancestors, to well known characters like Jack O'Newbury: the people who have created the towns and villages, roads and canals, fields and farms, industries, pastimes and organisations that forms West Berkshire today.

The second floor galleries feature a series of special exhibitions, along with Gallery 5 which can be hired to display original artwork, sculpture and craft.

Entry is free but donations are most welcome and go towards adding to and conserving the collections and maintaining the historic buildings.

The museum underwent a £2.2m renovation in 2014 to update its exhibition areas and visitor facilities. The funding came from the Heritage Lottery Fund (£1.2m), and West Berkshire Council, Greenham Common Trust and the Headley Trust (£1m total).
