= Berkshire =

County of England

Berkshire Royal County of Berkshire
- Ceremonial county
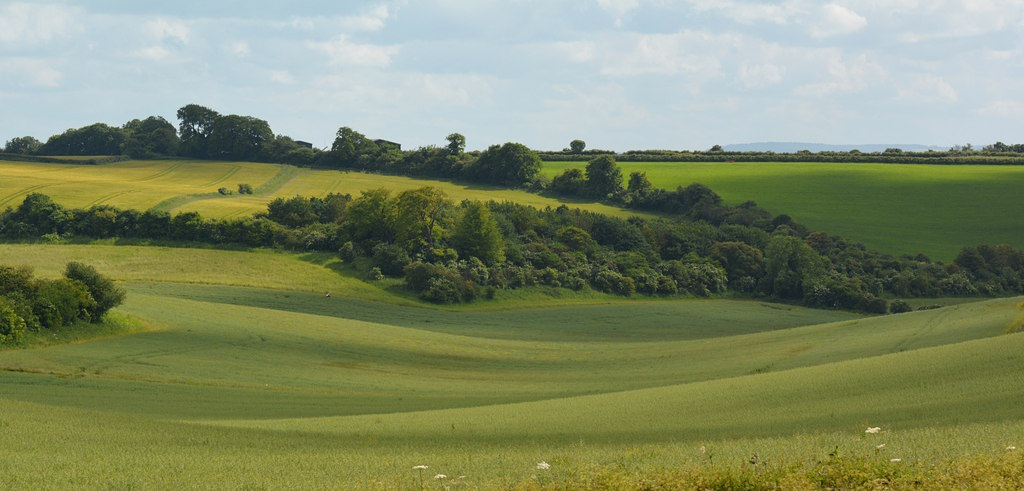
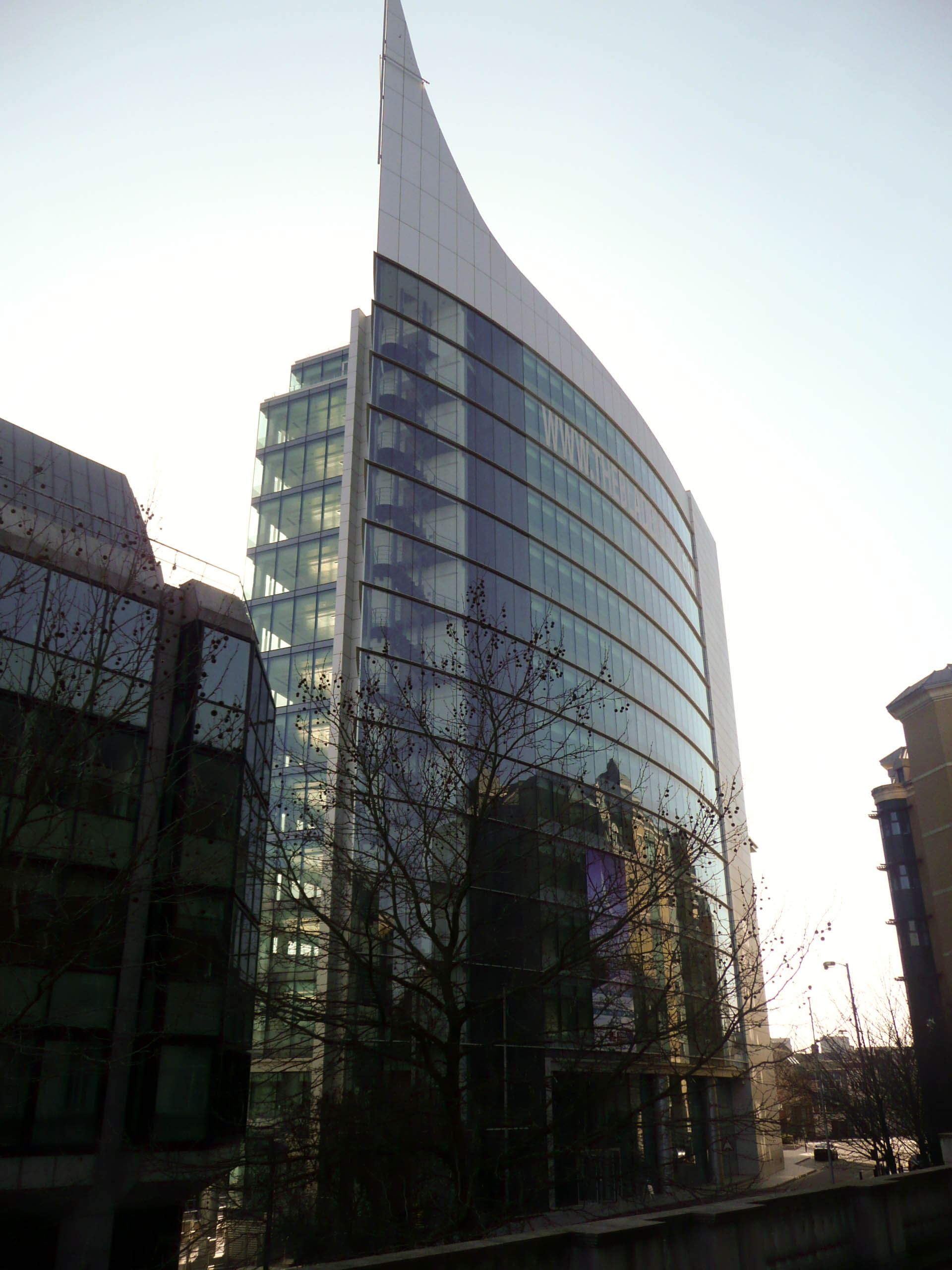
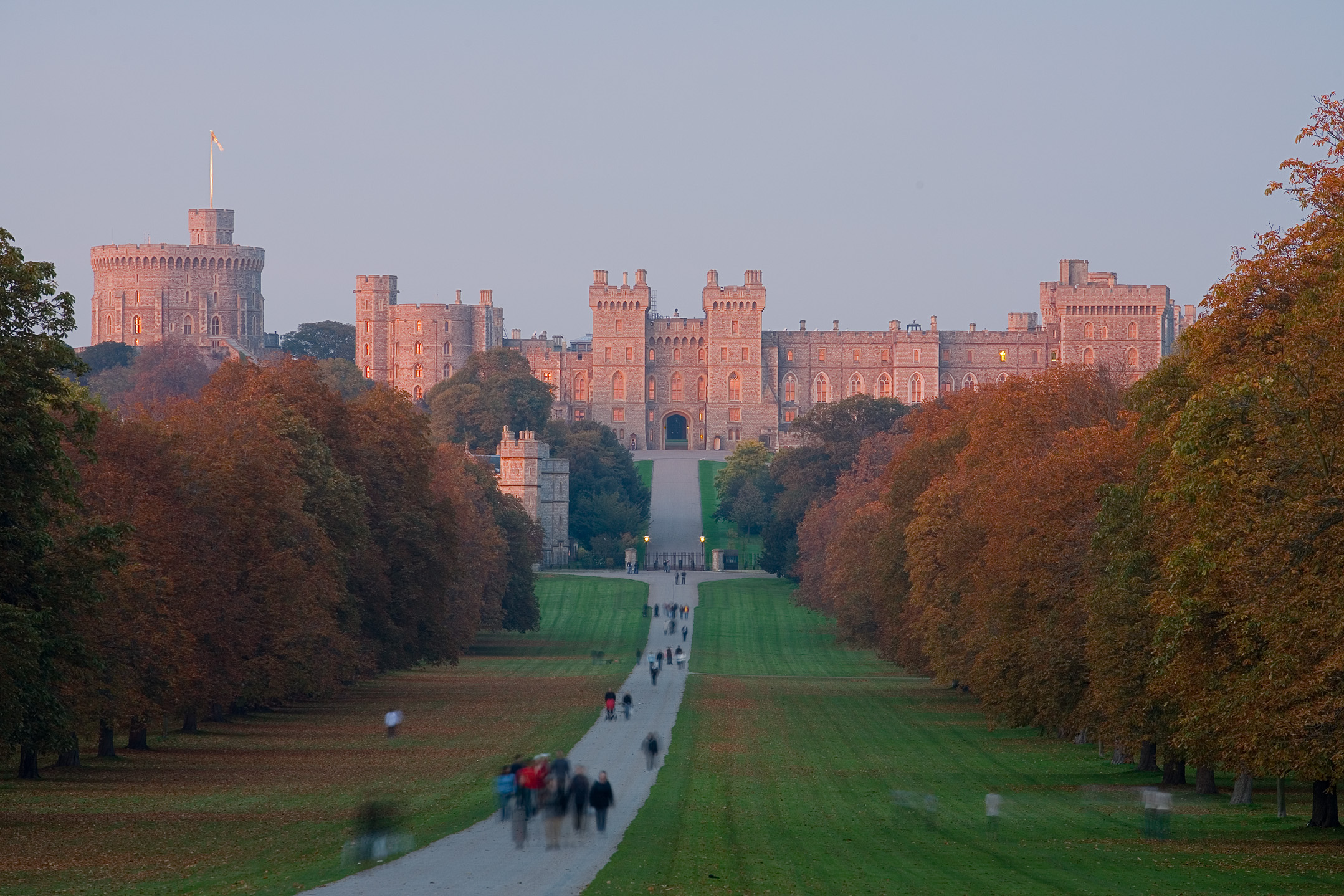
- The Berkshire Downs near Aldworth, The Blade, Reading, and Windsor Castle

- Coordinates: 51°25′N 1°00′W
- Sovereign state: United Kingdom
- Constituent country: England
- Region: South East
- Established: Ancient
- Time zone: UTC+0 (GMT)
  - Summer (DST): UTC+1 (BST)
- UK Parliament: 9 MPs
- Police: Thames Valley Police
- Fire: Royal Berkshire Fire & Rescue Service
- Ceremonial county
- Lord Lieutenant: Andrew Try
- High Sheriff: Renu Raksha Wing Kapur
- Area: 1,262 km^{2} (487 sq mi)
  - Rank: 40th of 48
- Population (2024): 992,327
  - Rank: 23rd of 48
  - Density: 786/km^{2} (2,040/sq mi)
- Districts
- Districts of Berkshire; Unitary
- Districts: List: West Berkshire; Reading; Wokingham; Bracknell Forest; Windsor and Maidenhead; Slough

Berkshire (/ˈbɑːkʃə/, /-ʃɪər/ BARK-shər, -sheer; abbreviated Berks.), officially the Royal County of Berkshire, is a ceremonial county in South East England. It is bordered by Oxfordshire to the north, Buckinghamshire to the north-east, Greater London to the east, Surrey to the south-east, Hampshire to the south, and Wiltshire to the west. Reading is the largest settlement and the county town.

The county has an area of 1,263 km^{2} (488 sq mi) and had an estimated population of 992,327 in 2024. The population is concentrated in the east, the area closest to Greater London, which includes the county's largest towns: Reading, Slough, Bracknell, and Maidenhead. The west is rural, and its largest town is Newbury. For local government purposes Berkshire comprises six unitary authority areas: Bracknell Forest, Reading, Slough, West Berkshire, Windsor and Maidenhead, and Wokingham. The historic county included the parts of Oxfordshire south of the River Thames, which formed its northern border, but excluded Caversham and Slough.

The Berkshire Downs, a chalk downland and area of outstanding natural beauty, occupy the west of the county. They are the source of the River Kennet, which flows east through Newbury before meeting the Thames at Reading. The Thames then forms Berkshire's northern border, flowing past Maidenhead before entering the county and flowing past Slough and Windsor. The south-east of the county contains Swinley Forest, a remnant of Windsor Forest now used as a forestry plantation.

There is evidence of prehistoric settlement on the Berkshire Downs, including the Iron Age Uffington White Horse, now in Oxfordshire. In the Anglo-Saxon period the region was contested by Mercia and Wessex, and Alfred the Great was born in Wantage, also now in Oxfordshire. Windsor Castle, which would become the official country residence of the British monarch, was built after the Norman Conquest. The county has been the site of several battles, particularly during the First English Civil War, when Reading and Wallingford were besieged and two battles took place at Newbury. The proximity of the east of the county to London led to development from the nineteenth century, when Slough became an industrial centre and Bracknell was designated a new town. Software development and high-tech industry dominate the economy in the east, but the west remains an agricultural region.

== History ==
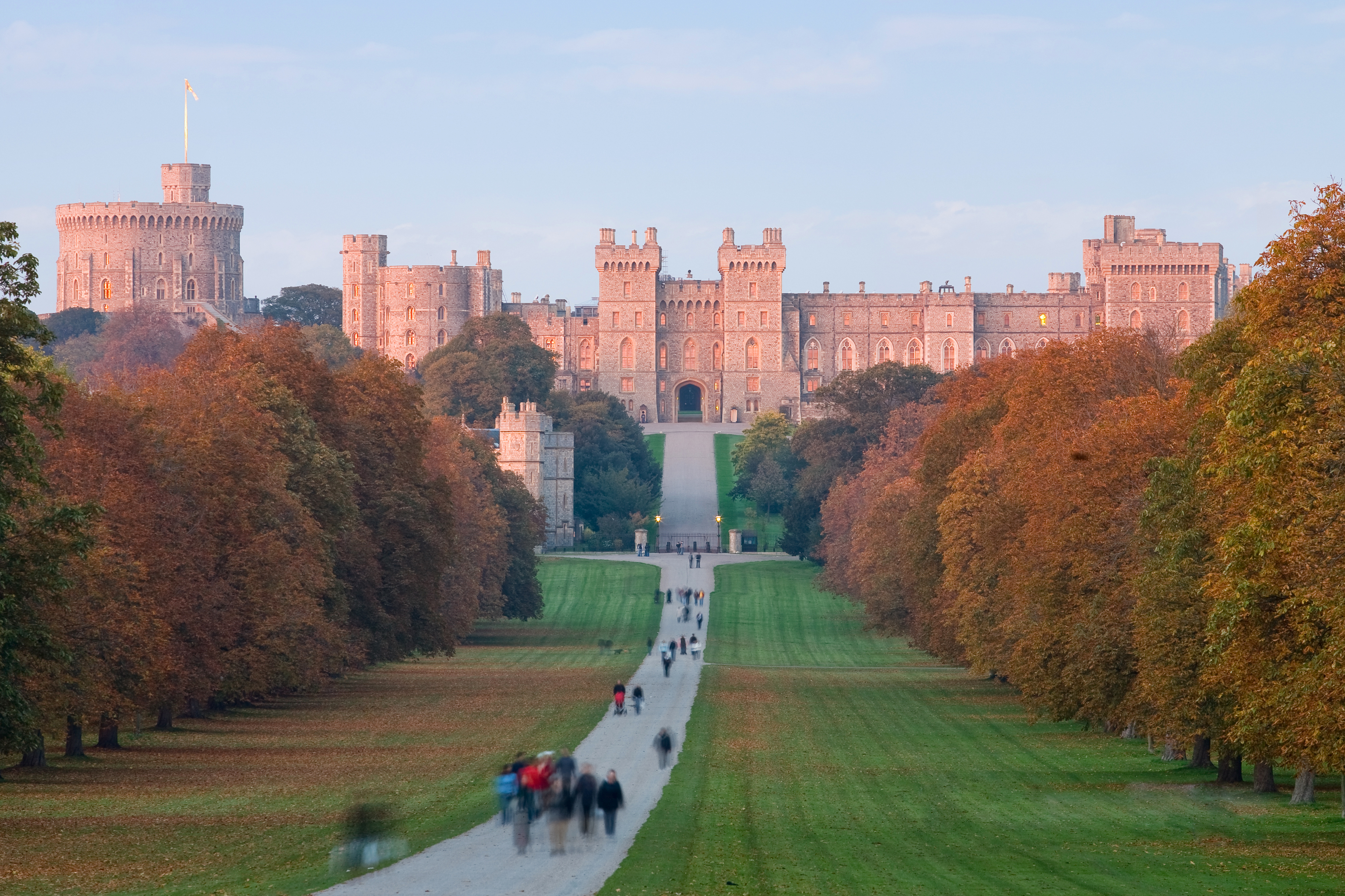
Windsor Castle, viewed from the Long Walk

According to Asser's biography of King Alfred, written in 893 AD, Berkshire takes its name from a wood of box trees, which was called Bearroc (a Celtic word meaning "hilly"). This wood, perhaps no longer extant, was west of Frilsham, near Newbury.

Much of the county's early history is recorded in the Chronicles of the Abingdon Abbey, which at the time of the survey was second only to the crown in the extent and number of its possessions, such as The Abbey, Sutton Courtenay. The abbot exercised considerable judicial and administrative powers, and his court was endowed with the privileges of the hundred court and freed from liability to interference by the sheriff. Berkshire and Oxfordshire had a common sheriff until the reign of Elizabeth I, and the shire court was held at Grandpont. The assizes were formerly held at Reading, Abingdon, and Newbury, but by 1911 were held entirely at Reading.

Berkshire has been the scene of notable battles. Alfred the Great's campaign against the Danes included the battles of Englefield, Ashdown and Reading. Newbury was the site of English Civil War battles: the First Battle of Newbury, at Wash Common in 1643, and the Second Battle of Newbury, at Speen in 1644. Donnington Castle was reduced to a ruin in the aftermath of the second battle. Another Battle of Reading took place on 9 December 1688. It was the only substantial military action in England during the Glorious Revolution and ended in a decisive victory for forces loyal to William of Orange.

Reading became the new county town in 1867, taking over from Abingdon, which remained in the county. Under the Local Government Act 1888, Berkshire County Council took over functions of the Berkshire Quarter Sessions, covering the administrative county of Berkshire, which excluded the county borough of Reading. Boundary alterations in the late 19th century and early 20th century were relatively rare, but included ceding the parts of the borough of Oxford south of the Thames in 1889, and gaining Caversham from Oxfordshire in 1911. The administrative county's full legal name was "Berks" rather than "Berkshire" until 1967, when the government changed the name to Berkshire at the county council's request.

Berkshire received the title "Royal County" in 1957 due to the presence of Windsor Castle. The area has historical ties to royalty dating back to the Norman Conquest, when William the Conqueror established Windsor as a royal residence. On 1 April 1974, Berkshire's boundaries changed under the Local Government Act 1972. Berkshire took over administration of Slough and Eton and part of the former Eton Rural District from Buckinghamshire. The northern part of the county came under governance of Oxfordshire, with Faringdon, Wantage and Abingdon and their hinterland becoming the Vale of White Horse district, and Didcot and Wallingford added to South Oxfordshire district. 94 (Berkshire Yeomanry) Signal Squadron still keep the Uffington White Horse in their insignia, even though the White Horse is now within the ceremonial county of Oxfordshire. The original Local Government White Paper would have transferred Henley-on-Thames from Oxfordshire to Berkshire: this proposal did not make it into the Bill as introduced.

On 1 April 1998 Berkshire County Council was abolished under a recommendation of the Banham Commission, and the districts became unitary authorities. Unlike similar reforms elsewhere at the same time, the non-metropolitan county was not abolished. (Note: This was done to maintain royal county status.) Signs saying "Welcome to the Royal County of Berkshire" exist on borders of West Berkshire, on the east side of Virginia Water, on the M4 motorway, on the south side of Sonning Bridge, on the A404 southbound by Marlow, and northbound on the A33 past Stratfield Saye.

Flag of the historic county of Berkshire

A flag for the historic county of Berkshire was registered with the Flag Institute in 2017.

== Geography ==
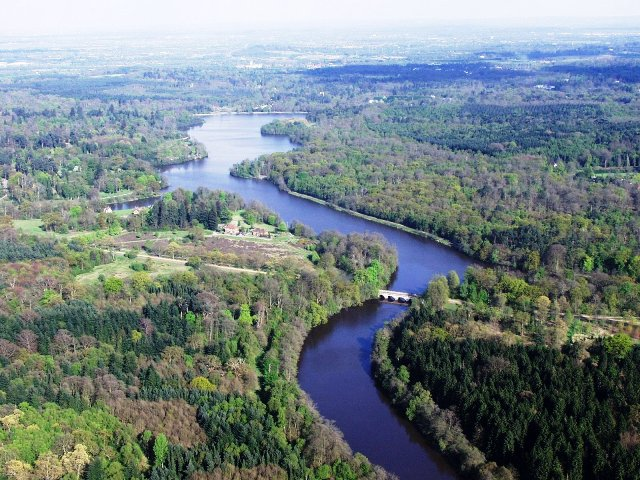
Virginia Water Lake on the southern edge of Windsor Great Park

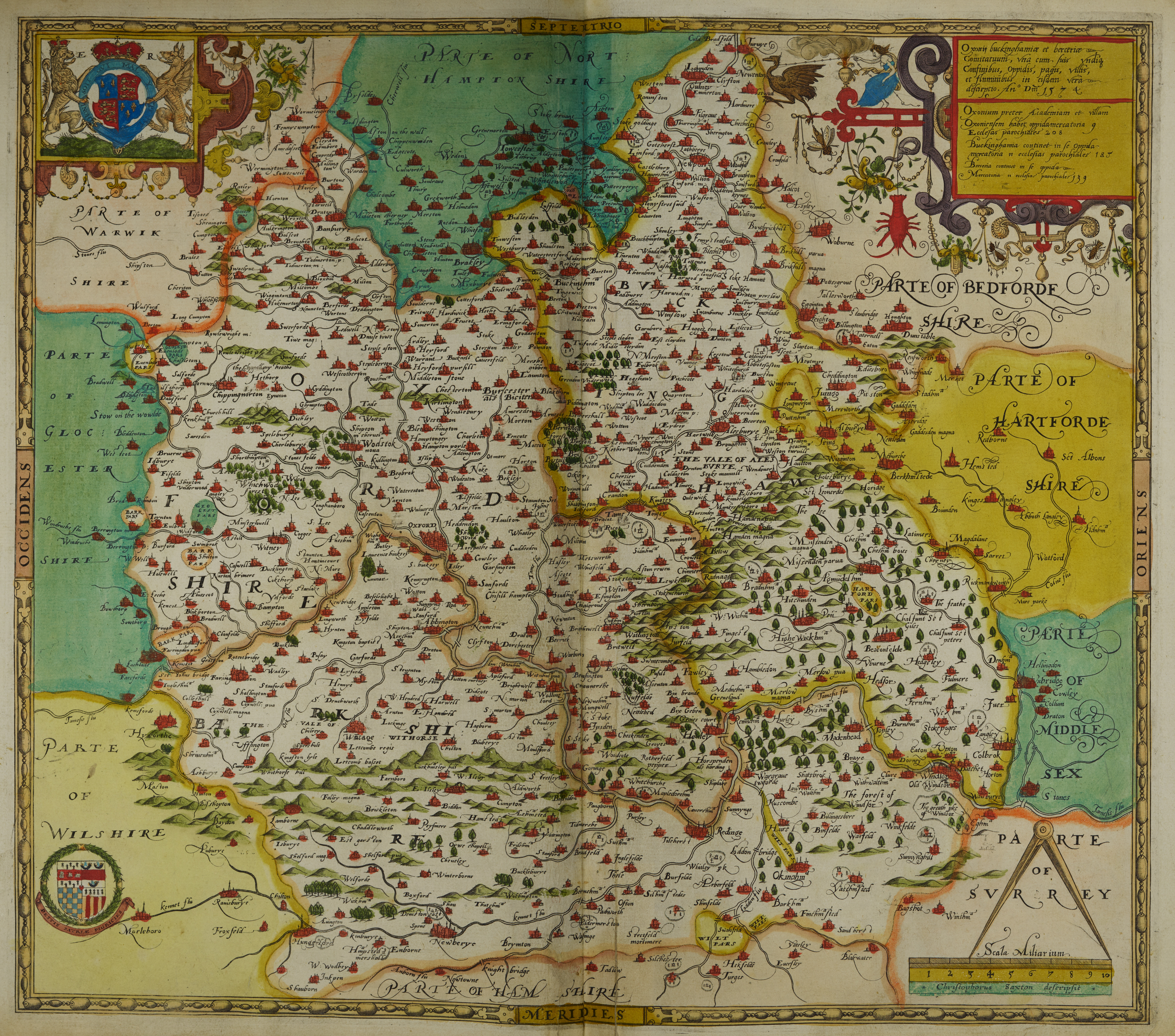
Hand-drawn map of Oxford, Buckinghamshire and Berkshire by Christopher Saxton from 1576.

All of the county is drained by the Thames. Berkshire divides into two topological (and associated geological) sections: east and west of Reading. North-east Berkshire has the low calciferous (limestone) m-shaped bends of the Thames south of which is a broader, clayey, gravelly former watery plain or belt from Earley to Windsor and beyond, south, are parcels and belts of uneroded higher sands, flints, shingles and lightly acid soil and in the north of the Bagshot Formation, north of Surrey and Hampshire. Swinley Forest (also known as Bracknell Forest), Windsor Great Park, Crowthorne and Stratfield Saye Woods have many pine, silver birch, and other lightly acid-soil trees. East of the grassy and wooded bends a large minority of East Berkshire's land mirrors the clay belt, being of low elevation and on the left (north) bank of the Thames: Slough, Eton, Eton Wick, Wraysbury, Horton, and Datchet. In the heart of the county Reading's northern suburb Caversham is also on that bank, but rises steeply into the Chiltern Hills.

Two main tributaries skirt past Reading, the Loddon and its sub-tributary the Blackwater draining parts of two counties south, and the Kennet draining part of upland Wiltshire in the west. Heading west the reduced, but equally large, part of the county extends further from the Thames which flows from the north-north-west before the Goring Gap; West Berkshire hosts the varying-width plain of the River Kennet rising to high chalk hills by way of and lower clay slopes and rises. To the south, the land crests along the boundary with Hampshire; the highest parts of South-East and Eastern England taken together are here. The highest is Walbury Hill at 297 m (974 ft). To the north of the Kennet are the Berkshire Downs. This is hilly country, with smaller and well-wooded valleys: those of the Lambourn, Pang, and their Thames sub-tributaries. The open upland areas vie with Newmarket, Suffolk for horse racing training and breeding centres and have good fields of barley, wheat, and other cereal crops.

=== Geology ===
Berkshire’s surface can be divided into three bands: the county's downlands, south and east of which the London Clay spans almost the whole county, and in the south-east corner sandy Palaeogene heath covers the London Clay. This is an oversimplification, however.

A gently folded succession of sedimentary rocks dating from the Cretaceous period, with some surviving Palaeogene cover and extensive Quaternary deposits, characterise the downlands, which cover the area to the west of Reading and the western edge of the Chiltern Hills. The lower (early) Cretaceous rocks are sandstones and mudstones (now visible only on the slopes of Walbury Hill) whilst those of the upper (late) Cretaceous are the various formations that comprise the Chalk Group. In Berkshire, White Chalk Formation beds tend to be shallower than those further west (Wiltshire) or those in the Chilterns, and often contain layers of chalk rock. Less consolidated Palaeogene clays, sands, gravels and silts of the Lambeth, Thames and Bracklesham Groups overlie these rocks in some areas. These hills, and the valleys that surround them, were shaped by the rivers Kennet, Lambourn, Pang and Enborne, and the Quaternary sands and gravels they brought with them and (in the case of the Kennet) left behind when they changed course.

The early Eocene London Clay (Thames Group) generally gets thinner as we proceed westwards, though the thickness of beds can vary considerably over short distances. Where rivers have cut through these beds Lambeth Group layers are found (notably, the Palaeocene Reading Formation, used for brick-making since Roman times but now increasingly scarce in the area after which it was named).

The heaths and woodland south and east of Bracknell are mostly covered by (Eocene) Bracklesham Group sands and clays, and Quaternary sands, silts and gravels. After the Thames broke through the Goring Gap that river and its tributaries the Loddon, Emm Brook, Blackwater and (to some extent) Wey shaped the geography of eastern Berkshire but have not yet eroded away its Eocene cover.

== Governance ==
Berkshire is a ceremonial county and non-metropolitan county. It is divided into six districts administered by unitary authorities. Berkshire County Council existed from 1889 until its abolition in 1998. The ceremonial county has a lord-lieutenant and a high sheriff. The Lord Lieutenant of Berkshire is Andrew Try.

The six unitary councils formed a joint Berkshire Prosperity Board in February 2024 and submitted an expression of interest in forming a non-mayoral combined authority in September 2024.

Berkshire districts
District	Main towns	Population (2007 estimate)	Area	Population density (2007)
Bracknell Forest	Bracknell, Sandhurst	113,696	109.38 km^{2}	1038/km^{2}
Reading	Reading	155,300	40.40 km^{2}	3557/km^{2}
Slough	Langley	140,200	53.89 km^{2}	2601/km^{2}
West Berkshire	Newbury, Thatcham	150,700	704.17 km^{2}	214/km^{2}
Windsor and Maidenhead	Windsor, Maidenhead	104,000	198.43 km^{2}	711/km^{2}
Wokingham	Wokingham, Twyford	88,600	178.98 km^{2}	875/km^{2}
Total (Ceremonial)	n/a	752,436	1264 km^{2}	643/km^{2}

=== Local ===
As of the 2023 local elections, Liberal Democrat groups of local councillors run the unitary authorities of West Berkshire, Windsor and Maidenhead and Wokingham (in coalition with the Labour Party) with employed executives, whereas Labour Party local councillors run both Bracknell Forest and Reading, with Slough being run by the Conservative Party.

=== Parliament ===
After the 2024 United Kingdom general election, 5 of the elected Members of Parliament (MPs) were Labour, 3 Liberal Democrat and one Conservative.

Constituency	Conservative	Liberal Democrat	Labour	Reform UK	Green	Others	Winner	Turnout
Bracknell	13,999 (31.9%)	4,768 (10.9%)	14,783 (33.7%)	7,445 (17.0%)	2,166 (4.9%)	480 (1.1%)	Labour	43,641
Maidenhead	18,932 (37.6%)	21,895 (43.5%)	5,766 (11.5%)	–	1,996 (4.0%)	791 (1.6%)	Liberal Democrats	49,380
Newbury	17,268 (35.3%)	19,645 (40.1%)	3,662 (7.5%)	5,357 (10.9%)	2,714 (5.5%)	153 (0.3%)	Liberal Democrats	48,799
Reading Central	8,961 (19.8%)	3,963 (8.8%)	21,598 (47.7%)	3,904 (8.6%)	6,417 (14.2%)	227 (0.5%)	Labour	45,070
Earley and Woodley	17,361 (37.8%)	6,142 (13.4%)	18,209 (39.7%)	–	3,418 (7.4%)	784 (1.7%)	Labour	45,914
Slough	7,457 (17.2%)	2,060 (4.8%)	14,666 (33.9%)	3,352 (7.7%)	1,873 (4.3%)	995 (2.3%)	Labour	43,178
Windsor	16,483 (36.4%)	9,539 (21.1%)	10,026 (22.2%)	4,660 (10.3%)	2,288 (5.1%)	1,629 (3.6%)	Conservative	44,625
Wokingham	17,398 (32.2%)	25,743 (47.7%)	3,631 (6.7%)	5,274 (9.8%)	1,953 (3.6%)	–	Liberal Democrats	54,999
Reading West and Mid Berkshire	14,912 (32.0%)	5,103 (11.0%)	16,273 (35.0%)	6,260 (13.4%)	3,169 (6.8%)	834 (1.8%)	Labour	46,609
Total votes	146,770	99,858	109,686	39,896	25,994	5,893	5 Labour, 3 Lib Dem, 1 Conservative	422,215

The prime minister between 2016 and 2019, Theresa May represented Maidenhead.

== Demography ==
Historical population
Year	Pop.	±%
1831	146,234	—
1841	161,759	+10.6%
1851	170,065	+5.1%
1861	176,256	+3.6%
1871	196,475	+11.5%
1881	218,363	+11.1%
1891	238,709	+9.3%
1901	252,571	+5.8%
1951	404,000	+60.0%
1983	680,000	+68.3%

According to 2003 estimates there were 803,657 people in Berkshire, or 636 people/km^{2}. The population is mostly based in the urban areas to the east and centre of the county: the largest towns here are Reading, Slough, Bracknell, Maidenhead, Woodley, Wokingham, Windsor, Earley, Sandhurst, and Crowthorne. West Berkshire is much more rural and sparsely populated, with far fewer towns: the largest are Newbury, Thatcham, and Hungerford. In recent years, Berkshire has seen consistent population growth, particularly in urban areas like Reading and Slough. Between 2011-21, the population increased by 6.7%, largely due to migration and economic opportunities in the region. Reading has experienced significant growth due to its reputation as a technology and business hub.

In 1831, there were 146,234 people living in Berkshire; by 1901 the population had risen to 252,571 (of whom 122,807 were male and 129,764 were female). Below were the largest immigrant groups in 2011.

Country of Birth	Immigrants in Berkshire (2011 Census)
India	23,660
Pakistan	17,590
Poland	16,435
Ireland	7,629
South Africa	6,221
Germany	5,328
Kenya	4,617
China	4,242
Zimbabwe	4,043
United States	3,509

== Economy ==
Regional gross value added of Berkshire at current basic prices (GBP millions)
Year	Regional gross value added (Note: Components may not sum to totals due to rounding)	Agriculture (Note: Includes hunting and forestry)	Industry (Note: Includes energy and construction)	Services (Note: Includes financial intermediation services indirectly measured)
1995	10,997	53	2,689	8,255
2000	18,412	40	3,511	14,861
2003	21,119	48	3,666	17,406

=== Industry ===
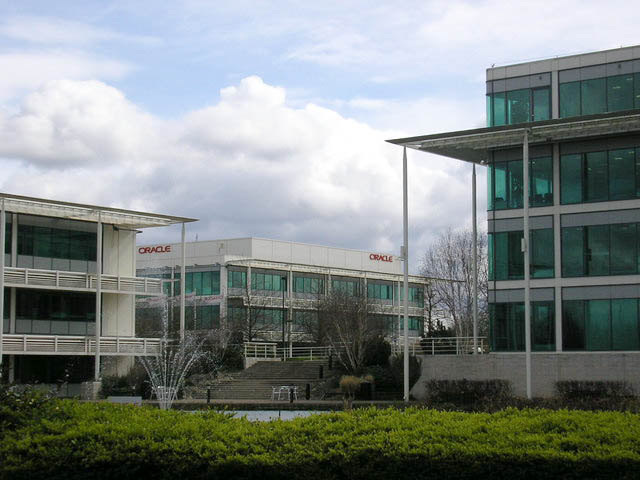
The Oracle Corporation campus

Reading has a historical involvement in the information technology industry, largely as a result of the early presence in the town of sites of International Computers Limited and Digital. These companies have been swallowed by other groups, but their descendants, Fujitsu and Hewlett-Packard respectively, still have local operations. More recently Microsoft and Oracle have established multi-building campuses on the outskirts of Reading. Other technology companies with a presence in the town include Huawei Technologies, Agilent Technologies, Audio & Design (Recording) Ltd, Bang & Olufsen, Cisco, Comptel, Ericsson, Gen Digital, Harris Corporation, Intel, Nvidia, Rockwell Collins, Sage, SGI, Symbol Technologies, Verizon Business, Virgin Media O2, Websense, Xansa (now Sopra Steria), and Xerox. The financial company ING Direct has its headquarters in Reading, as does the directories company Hibu. The insurance company Prudential has an administration centre in the town. PepsiCo and Holiday Inn have offices. As with most major cities, Reading also has offices of the Big Four accounting firms Deloitte, Ernst & Young, KPMG and PricewaterhouseCoopers. The 110-year old charity, Berkshire Vision is also located within Reading city centre.

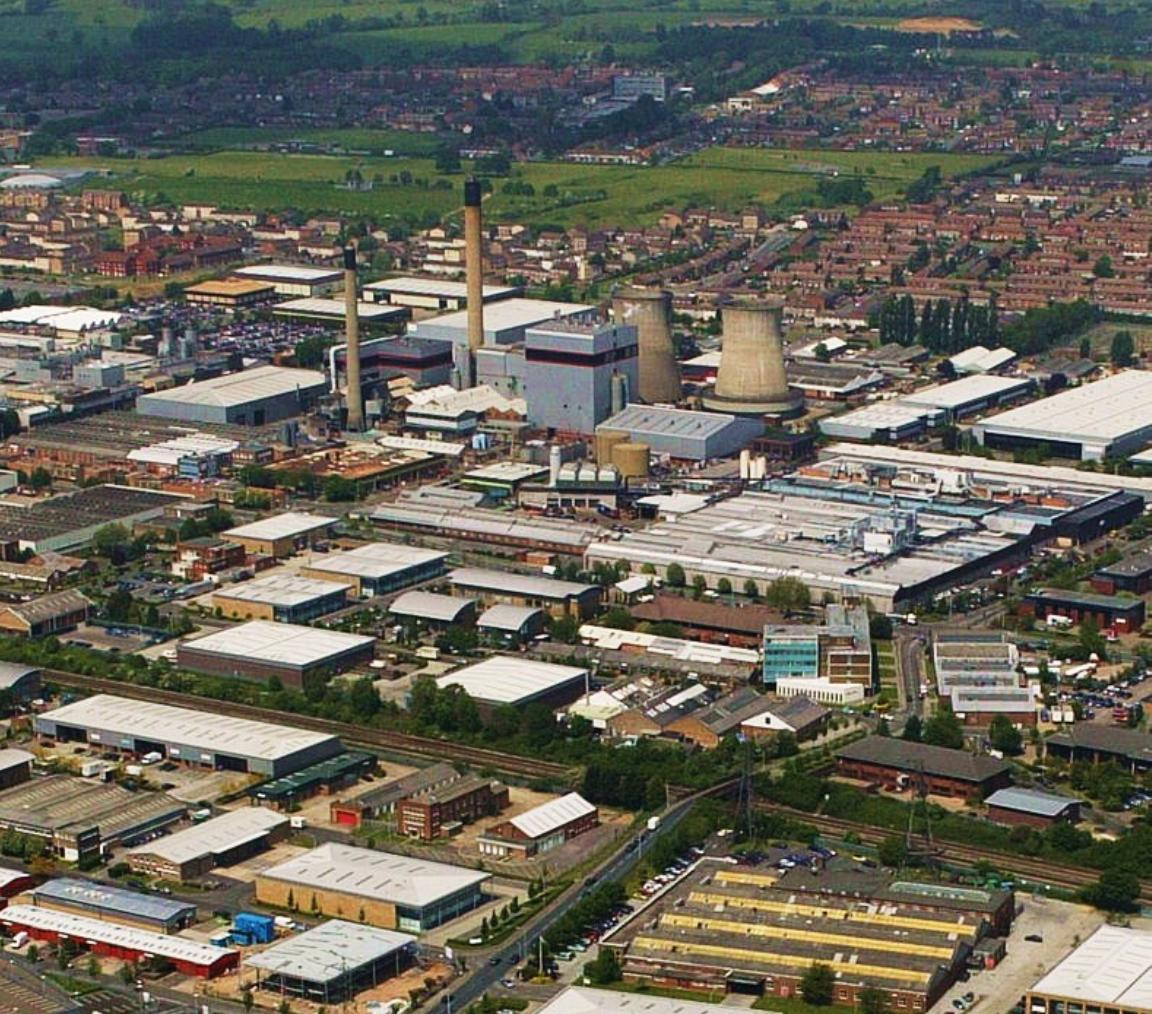
Slough Trading Estate plays a major part in making Slough a business centre in South East England

The global headquarters of Reckitt Benckiser and the UK headquarters of Mars, Incorporated are based in Slough. The European head offices of major IT companies BlackBerry, CA Technologies, are in the town. The town is home to the National Foundation for Educational Research, which is housed in The Mere. Other major brands with offices in the town include Nintendo, Black & Decker, Amazon, HTC, SSE plc and Abbey Business Centres. Dulux paints were manufactured in Slough by AkzoNobel, which bought Imperial Chemical Industries in 2008. Manufacturing ceased in 2018 with operations moving elsewhere, however the UK headquarters is still based there.

Bracknell is a base for high-tech industries, with the presence of companies such as Panasonic, Fujitsu (formerly ICL) and Fujitsu-Siemens Computers, Dell, Hewlett-Packard, Siemens (originally Nixdorf), Honeywell, Cable & Wireless, Avnet Technology Solutions and Novell. Firms spread into the surrounding Thames Valley or M4 corridor, attracting IT firms such as Cable & Wireless, DEC (subsequently Hewlett-Packard), Microsoft, Sharp Telecommunications, Oracle Corporation, Sun Microsystems and Cognos. Bracknell is home to the central Waitrose distribution centre and head office, which is on a 70-acre (280,000 m^{2}) site on the Southern Industrial Estate. Waitrose has operated from the town since the 1970s. The town is also home to the UK headquarters of Honda and BMW.

Newbury is home to the world headquarters of the mobile network operator Vodafone, which is the town's largest employer with over 6,000 people. Before moving to their £129 million headquarters in the outskirts of the town in 2002, Vodafone used 64 buildings spread across the town centre. As well as Vodafone, Newbury is also home to National Instruments, Micro Focus, EValue, NTS Express Road Haulage, Jokers' Masquerade and Quantel. It also is home to the Newbury Building Society, which operates in the region.

In Compton, a small village, roughly 10 miles from Newbury, a chemical manufacturing company called Carbosynth was founded, in 2006. Since 2019, it has merged with a Swiss company called Biosynth AG to form a key global organisation within the fine chemical industry and operates under name Biosynth Carbosynth^{®}. Biosynth Carbosynth, along with its acquired companies, vivitide and Pepscan rebranded to Biosynth in 2022.

London Heathrow Airport, in the neighbouring London Borough of Hillingdon, is a major contributor to the economy of Slough in east Berkshire.

=== Agricultural produce ===
Abingdon Abbey once had dairy-based granges in the south-east of the county, Red Windsor cheese was developed with red marbling. Some Berkshire cheeses are Wigmore, Waterloo and Spenwood (named after Spencers Wood) in Riseley; and Barkham Blue, Barkham Chase and Loddon Blewe at Barkham.

== Media ==
=== Local media ===
Local news and television programmes are covered by BBC South and ITV Meridian for the Thames Valley from the Hannington TV transmitter. Those parts of Berkshire closest to London such as Maidenhead, Windsor and Slough, receive BBC London and ITV London from the Crystal Palace TV transmitter.

The county’s local radio stations are BBC Radio Berkshire, Heart South and Greatest Hits Radio Berkshire & North Hampshire.

=== Film and television production ===
Berkshire has become a hub for film and television production, characterised by a transition from traditional location filming to the establishment of world-class studio infrastructure. Historically known for providing backdrops to franchises like Harry Potter and James Bond, the region's industry was transformed in the early 2020s by the development of Shinfield Studios, Arborfield Studios and Winnersh Film Studios. Located within the University of Reading's Cine Valley at Thames Valley Science Park, the 18-stage complex is one of the largest in the United Kingdom. This expansion, supported by the BFI Berkshire Skills for Screen Cluster, has attracted major Hollywood tenants including Disney, Netflix, and Sony Pictures, hosting high-profile productions. Historically, Bray Film Studios have been host to a number of productions, including many of the Hammer Horror films.

== Sport ==
=== Horse racing ===
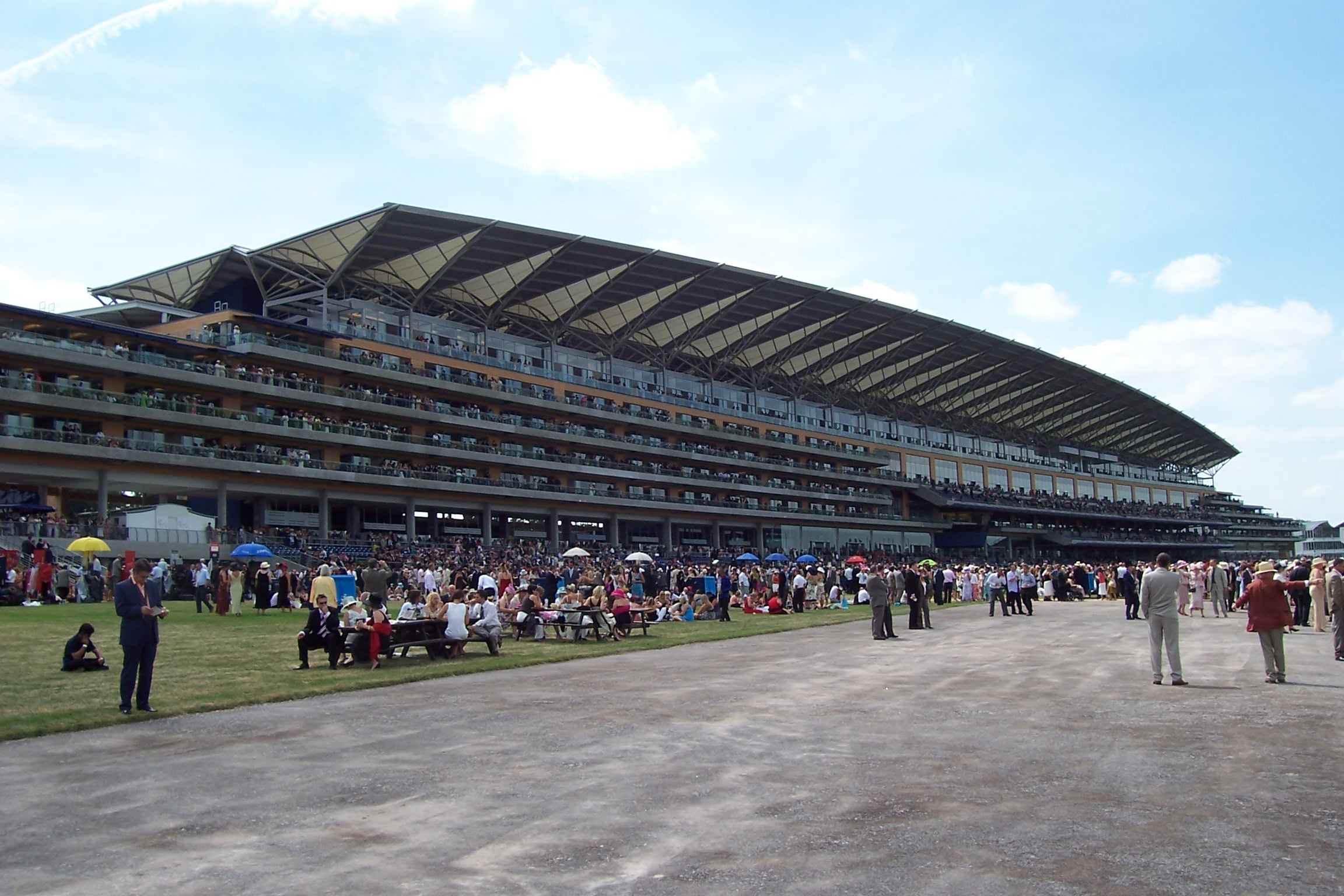
The grandstand at Ascot Racecourse

Berkshire hosts more Group 1 flat horse races than any other county. Ascot Racecourse is used for thoroughbred horse racing. It is one of the leading racecourses in the United Kingdom, hosting 13 of the UK's 35 annual Group 1 races. The course is closely associated with the British royal family, being approximately 6 mi (10 km) from Windsor Castle, and owned by the Crown Estate.

Ascot today stages twenty-five days of racing over the course of the year, comprising sixteen flat meetings held between May and October. The Royal Meeting, held in June, remains a major draw; the highlight is the Ascot Gold Cup. The most prestigious race is the King George VI and Queen Elizabeth Stakes run in July.

Newbury Racecourse is in the civil parish of Greenham, adjoining the town of Newbury. It has courses for flat races and over jumps. It hosts one of Great Britain's 32 Group 1 races, the Lockinge Stakes. It also hosts the Ladbrokes Trophy, which is said to be the biggest handicap race of the National Hunt racing season apart from the Grand National.

Windsor Racecourse, also known as Royal Windsor Racecourse, is a thoroughbred horse racing venue located in Windsor. It is one of only two figure-of-eight courses in the United Kingdom. (The other is Fontwell Park Racecourse). It abandoned National Hunt jump racing in December 1998, switching entirely to flat racing.

Lambourn also has a rich history in horse racing, the well drained, spongy grass, open downs and long flats make the Lambourn Downs ideal for training racehorses. This area of West Berkshire is the largest centre of racehorse training in the UK after Newmarket, and is known as the 'Valley of the Racecourse'.

=== Football ===
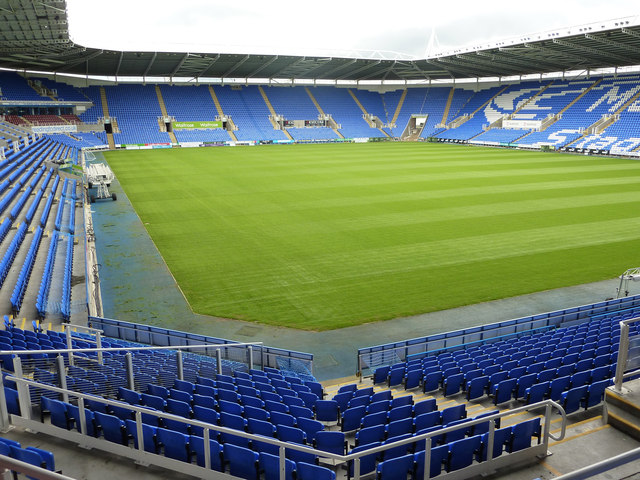
The Select Car Leasing Stadium in Reading

Reading F.C. is the only Berkshire football club to play professional football. Despite being founded in 1871, the club did not join the Football League until 1920, and first played in the top tier of English football in the 2006–07 season.

Newbury was home to A.F.C. Newbury, which was one of only two football clubs to be sponsored by Vodafone (the other being Manchester United). In 2006 Vodafone ended its sponsorship of the club, following which the club collapsed. A local pub team from the Old London Apprentice took over the ground temporarily and now compete in the Hellenic Football League as Newbury F.C.

There are several amateur and semi-professional football clubs in the county. These include Maidenhead United, Slough Town, Windsor & Eton F.C., Hungerford Town, Thatcham Town, Ascot United, A.F.C. Aldermaston, Sandhurst Town, Windsor F.C., Wokingham & Emmbrook F.C., Binfield F.C., Bracknell Town F.C. and Reading City.

Berkshire is well known for being home to the Thames River Derby as it is one of England's oldest footballing rivalries. The fixture is played between Slough Town and Windsor & Eton F.C. on opposite sides of the River Thames.

=== Rugby ===
Reading is a centre for rugby union football. The Premiership team London Irish were for 20 years tenants at the Madejski Stadium before their move back to SW London at a new stadium in Brentford.

Newbury's rugby union club, Newbury R.F.C. (the Newbury 'Blues'), is based in the town. In the 2004–05 season, the club finished second in the National Two division earning promotion to National One. Newbury had previously won National Four South (now renamed as National Three South) in 1996–97 with a 100% win record. In 2010–11 the club finished bottom of National League 2S, with a single win and twenty-nine defeats. The club was founded in 1928 and in 1996 moved to a new purpose-built ground at Monks Lane, which has since hosted England U21 fixtures.

=== Ice hockey ===
The Bracknell Bees ice hockey club are former national champions, who play in the English Premier League.

Slough Jets also play in the English Premier League winning the title in 2007. Slough Jets also won the play-offs in 2005–06, 2007–08, 2009–10 and 2011–12. They also won the EPIH Cup in 2010–11. Slough Jets have been in the EPIHL since 1999.

=== Hockey ===
Phoenix Reading Hockey Club, based at Reading University, has six adult teams and a large junior development section. Reading Hockey Club and Sonning Hockey Club are situated close to each other near Blue Coats School. Slough Hockey Club is home to the Slough Ladies 1XI who play in the Women's Premier League, with five adult teams. In 2016, Bracknell and Wokingham Hockey Clubs merged to form South Berkshire Hockey Club. The team plays at Cantley Park in Wokingham and occasionally at Birch Hill, Bracknell. Other hockey teams in the county include Tadley, Yateley, Maidenhead, Windsor, and Newbury & Thatcham Hockey Clubs.

== Education ==
Berkshire is home to the University of Reading (which includes the Henley Business School), Imperial College's Silwood Park campus, and the University of West London's Reading campus. It is also home to The Chartered Institute of Marketing, prestigious independent schools Ludgrove School, Eton College and Wellington College, and several grammar schools including Reading School, Kendrick School and Herschel Grammar School.

== Notable people ==
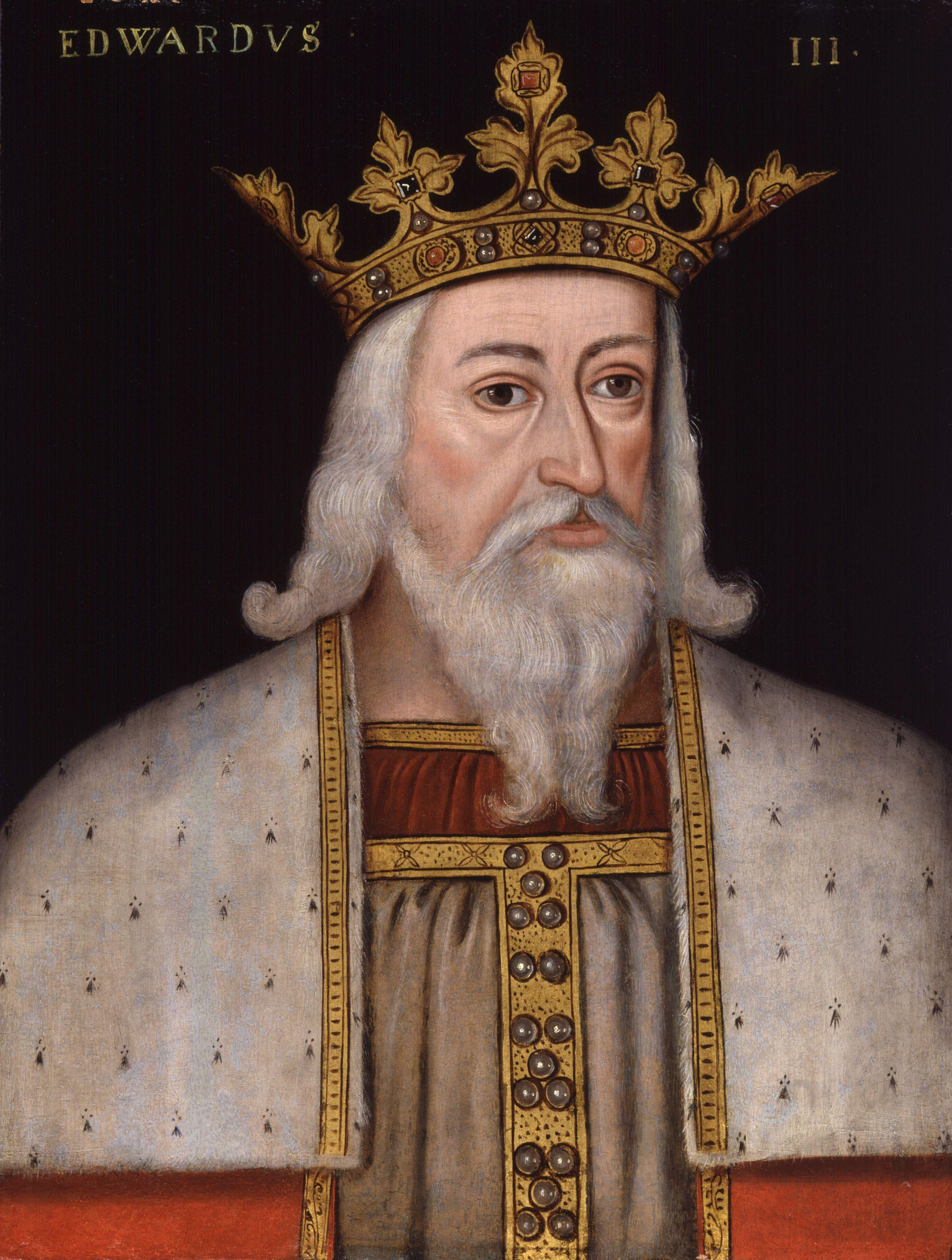
King Edward III of England

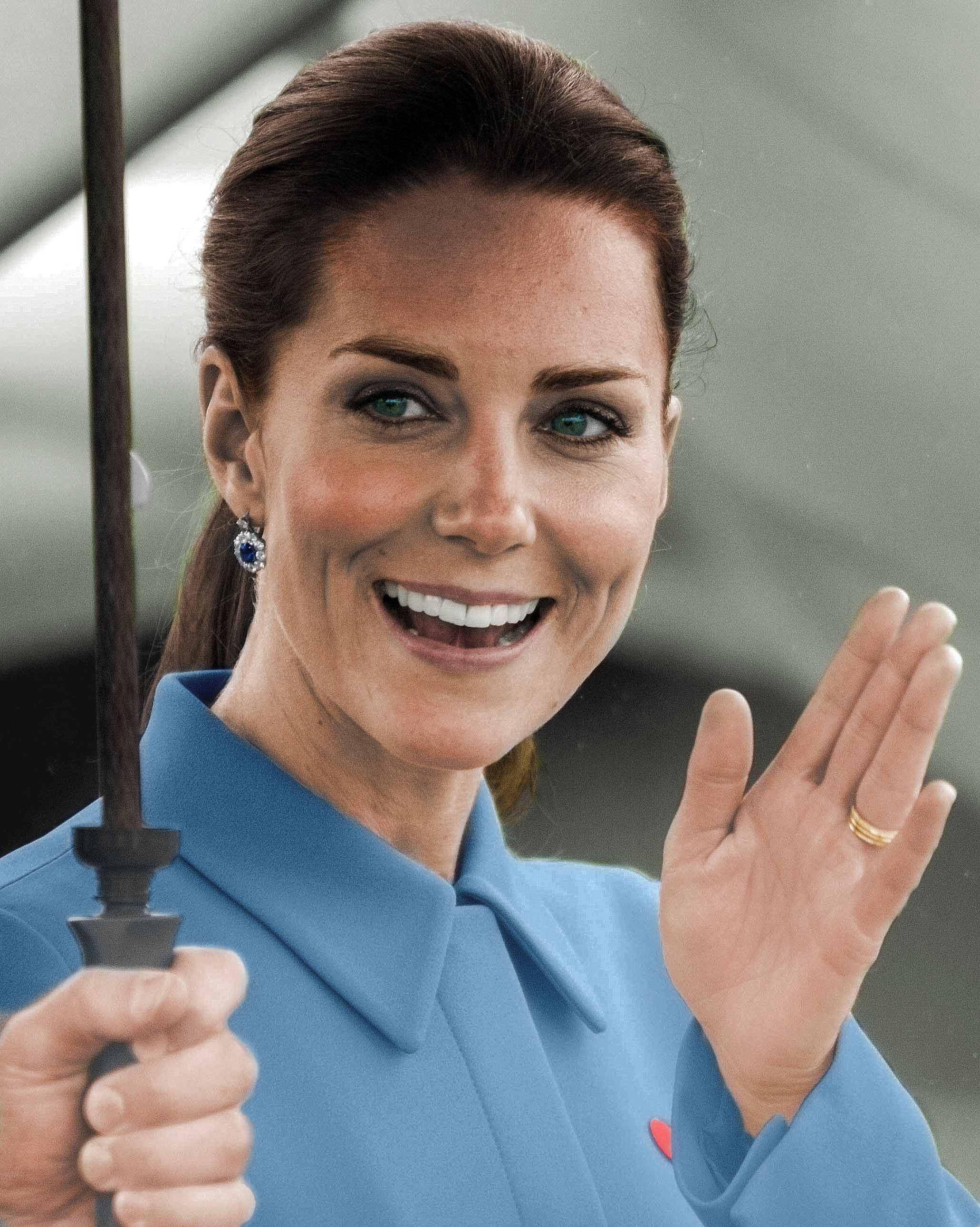
Catherine, Princess of Wales

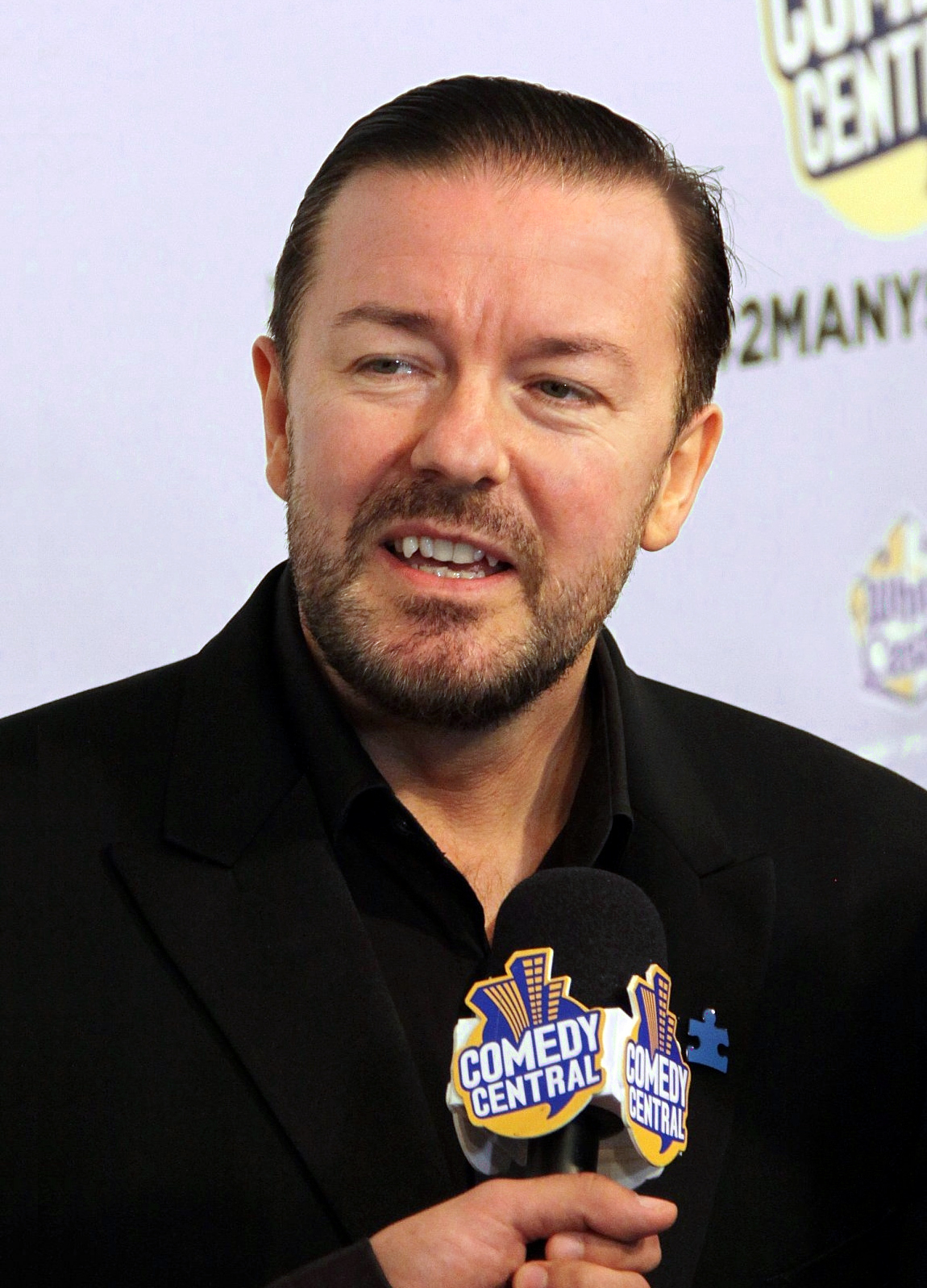
Ricky Gervais

Berkshire has many notable people associated with it.

- King Henry I of England (1068/1069–1135; founded and buried at Reading Abbey)
- King Edward III of England (born 1312–1377; one of the most successful English monarchs of the Middle Ages)
- King Henry VI of England (1421–1471; King of England, born at Windsor)
- Prince Albert Victor (1864–1892; eldest son of Albert Edward, Prince of Wales, later King Edward VII)
- Catherine, Princess of Wales (born 1982; spouse of William, Prince of Wales)
- Henry Addington, 1st Viscount Sidmouth (1757–1844; former prime minister; donor of land for Royal Berkshire Hospital)
- Sir George Alexander (1858–1918; actor and theatre manager)
- Jane Austen (1775–1817; author)
- Francis Baily (1774–1844; astronomer)
- Lucy Benjamin (born 1970; actress)
- Michael Bond (1926–2017; author, creator of Paddington Bear)
- Sir Michael Parkinson (1935–2023)
- Sir Kenneth Branagh (born 1960; actor and film director)
- Charlie Brooker (born 1971; journalist)
- Richard Burns (1971–2005; rally driver)
- David Cameron, Baron Cameron of Chipping Norton (born 1966; former prime minister of the United Kingdom and Leader of the Conservative Party from December 2005 to July 2016)
- Jimmy Carr (born 1972; comedian)
- Emilia Clarke (born 1986; actress)
- Emma Crosby (1977; television presenter)
- Natalie Dormer (born 1982; actress, screenwriter, producer)
- Polly Elwes (1928–1987; television reporter and announcer)
- Uri Geller (born 1946; mentalist)
- Ricky Gervais (born 1961; comedian)
- Dani Harmer (born 1989; actress)
- Chesney Hawkes (born 1971; pop singer)
- Sir Lenny Henry (born 1958; comedian)
- Daniel Howell (born 1991; professional vlogger and BBC Radio 1 presenter)
- Max & Harvey (born 2002; twin musicians, CBBC presenters and social-media stars)
- Nicholas Hoult (born 1989; actor)
- Kate Humble (born 1968; television presenter)
- Joseph Huntley (born 1775; innovative biscuit maker; founder of Huntley & Palmers)
- Sir Elton John (born 1947; lives in Old Windsor)
- Peter Jones (born 1966; entrepreneur)
- John Kendrick (1573–1624; merchant and mayor)
- William Laud (1573–1645; former archbishop of Canterbury)
- Suzanna Leigh (born 1945; actress)
- Jeremy Kyle (born 1965; British radio and television presenter, best known for hosting his own daytime show The Jeremy Kyle Show)
- Lesley Langley (Miss United Kingdom 1965 and Miss World 1965)
- Camilla Luddington (born 1983; actress)
- Sir John Madejski (born 1941; entrepreneur and philanthropist)
- Sir Sam Mendes (born 1965; director)
- Sir Tony McCoy (born 1974; jockey and winner of the 2010 Grand National and the 2010 BBC Sports Personality of the Year)
- William Penn (1644–1718; founder of Pennsylvania)
- Alexander Pope (1688–1744; poet)
- Alexander Prior (born 1992; composer and conductor)
- Lawrie Sanchez (born 1959; former footballer and manager)
- Ayrton Senna (1960–1994; racing driver, Formula One champion)
- Mark Stephens (born Old Windsor 1957), solicitor and broadcaster, mediator, writer, educator and patron of the arts
- Jethro Tull (1674–1741; agriculturist)
- Chris Tarrant (born 1946; radio broadcaster and host of Who Wants to Be a Millionaire?)
- James Towillis, English landscape artist
- Theo Walcott (born 1989; footballer, originally for A.F.C. Newbury)
- Neil Webb (born 1963; professional footballer)
- Oscar Wilde (1854–1900; poet and playwright, author of The Ballad of Reading Gaol, and prisoner in Reading Gaol)
- Kate Winslet (born 1975; actress)
- Will Young (born 1979; singer-songwriter)

== Places of interest ==
Key
	Abbey/Priory/Cathedral
Accessible open space	Accessible open space
	Amusement/Theme Park
	Castle
Country Park	Country Park
	English Heritage
	Forestry Commission
Heritage railway	Heritage railway
Historic house	Historic House
Places of Worship	Places of Worship
Museum (free) Museum	Museum (free/not free)
National Trust	National Trust
	Theatre
	Zoo

- Basildon Park
- Beale Park
- Berkshire Downs
- Bisham Abbey
- Blake's Lock
- California Country Park
- Calleva Atrebatum
- Combe Gibbet
- Donnington Castle
- Eagle House School
- Eton College
- Frogmore House
- Greenham Common
- Highclere Castle
- Lardon Chase, the Holies and Lough Down
- The Living Rainforest
- Legoland Windsor
- Museum of English Rural Life
- Museum of Reading
- North Wessex Downs Area of Outstanding Natural Beauty
- Reading Abbey
- Reading School Grade II listed building designed by Alfred Waterhouse
- River Thames
- Shaw House
- Slough Museum
- Stanlake Park Wine Estate
- The Ridgeway
- Walbury Hill
- Watermill Theatre
- Welford Park
- Wellington College, Berkshire
- West Berkshire Museum
- Windsor Castle
- Windsor Great Park

== See also ==
- Berkshire (UK Parliament constituency)
- Berkshire Record Office
- Custos Rotulorum of Berkshire
- List of English and Welsh endowed schools (19th century)#Berkshire
