= Riseley, Berkshire =

Village in Berkshire, England

Coordinates: 51.363216°N 0.962116°W

Riseley
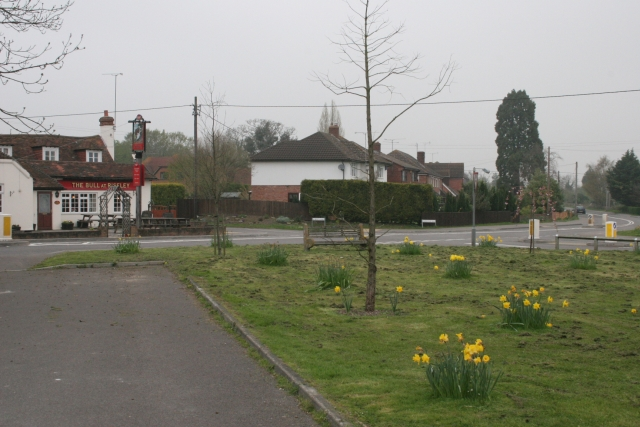
- Riseley village green with the 'Bull at Riseley' public house behind

- Location within Berkshire
- OS grid reference: SU722632
- Civil parish: Swallowfield
- Unitary authority: Wokingham
- Ceremonial county: Berkshire
- Region: South East
- Country: England
- Sovereign state: United Kingdom
- Post town: READING
- Postcode district: RG7
- Dialling code: 0118
- Police: Thames Valley
- Fire: Royal Berkshire
- Ambulance: South Central
- UK Parliament: Wokingham

Riseley is a village in the English county of Berkshire, adjacent to the border with Hampshire. It is located around 6 miles (9.7 km) south of Reading and 8 miles (13 km) north-east of Basingstoke, and is bypassed to the west by the A33 road. For local government purposes, the village is today within the civil parish of Swallowfield, which in turn is within the unitary authority of Wokingham. Before 1844, Riseley was part of a detached portion, or exclave, of the county of Wiltshire, some 30 miles to the west. The Counties Act of that year resulted in its transfer to Berkshire. Riseley lies on the line of the Roman Road, Devil's Highway
