= Slough Museum =

Coordinates: 51.507°N 0.586°W

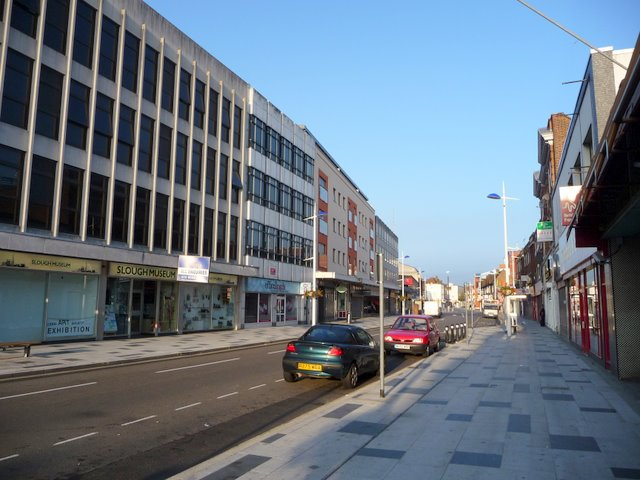
The museum (left) on the High Street, Slough

Slough Museum is an independent museum in Slough in the English county of Berkshire. It had two exhibition galleries presenting the past, present and future of the town. It is now situated in the Slough Trading Estate with an exhibition curated in partnership with SEGRO highlighting the history of the trading estate.

== History ==
The museum began collecting artefacts in 1986 and opened to the public the same year, and has 10,000 objects and photographs relating to the development of Slough. It moved to the eastern end of Slough High Street in 1997. In 2023, it reopened after having relocated to the Slough Trading Estate.
