= EValue =

Software companies of the United Kingdom

EV
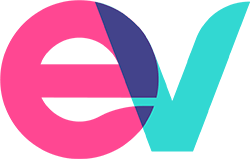
- Type: Private limited company
- Industry: Fintech
- Founded: 2011
- Headquarters: Newbury, Berkshire, England (head office), London (small office)
- Area served: United Kingdom
- Key people: Ashok Gupta (Chairman) Michael Holland (Director)
- Number of employees: 100 (approx.) (2021)
- Website: www.ev.uk

EV is a technology company based in the United Kingdom providing digital, personal finance advice with products that combine actuarial knowledge, asset modelling and risk management. The company maintains its head office in Benyon House, Newbury Business Park, Berkshire, with a smaller office in London.

== History ==
In February 2021, EValue rebranded to become known as EV.

In October of 2020, former FE Director of Sales and Business Development, Gary Wheeler joined EValue as Chief Commercial Officer (CCO).

In May 2017, EValue appointed Paul McNamara as chief executive, replacing Mark Cappell. Paul McNamara was previously Group Chief Executive of IFG Group plc and, prior to his role with IFG, he worked in senior leadership roles for McKinsey, AXA, HBOS, Standard Life and Barclays. Paul holds an MBA from CASS Business School/City University in London, where he currently serves as a member of the MBA Advisory Board. He is a member of the Trustee Board of Addison's Disease Self Help Group, a Freeman of the City of London and a Liveryman of the Actuaries Company.

On receiving the position, McNamara said "EValue has a dynamic team and is poised to lead in the emerging market for robo-advice and artificial intelligence solutions."

In April 2018, EValue was part of Empire FinTech Week in New York City.

== Products and technology ==
The company's flagship products is their Insight Asset Model, a stochastic model for financial forecasting and asset allocation. The company also provides an API to their technology.

The Chief Executive highlighted a key focus for the company was to use technology to help bridge the widening financial advice gap.

In September 2018, EValue launched Fin, a gamified digital assistant to help consumers explore their pension drawdown choices, and thus understand how long their income might last in retirement.

In early 2019, EValue launched a robo-advice service for advisers aimed at clients approaching their retirement.

== Recognition and awards ==
In 2018, EValue was awarded bronze in UK Employee Experience Awards in the category of Employee Engagement – Values & Strategy.

In 2019, EValue was listed in the WealthTech100 as one of the 100 most innovative companies globally by Fintech Global.
