= List of children of clergy =

List of noted children of clergy is a list of notable persons concerned with individuals whose status as a child of a cleric or preacher is important, preferably critical, to their fame or significance.

== Western religions ==
=== Christian ===
==== Pre-Schism ====
- Saint Patrick, Patron Saint of Ireland, son of a British deacon and grandson of a priest

==== Catholic ====
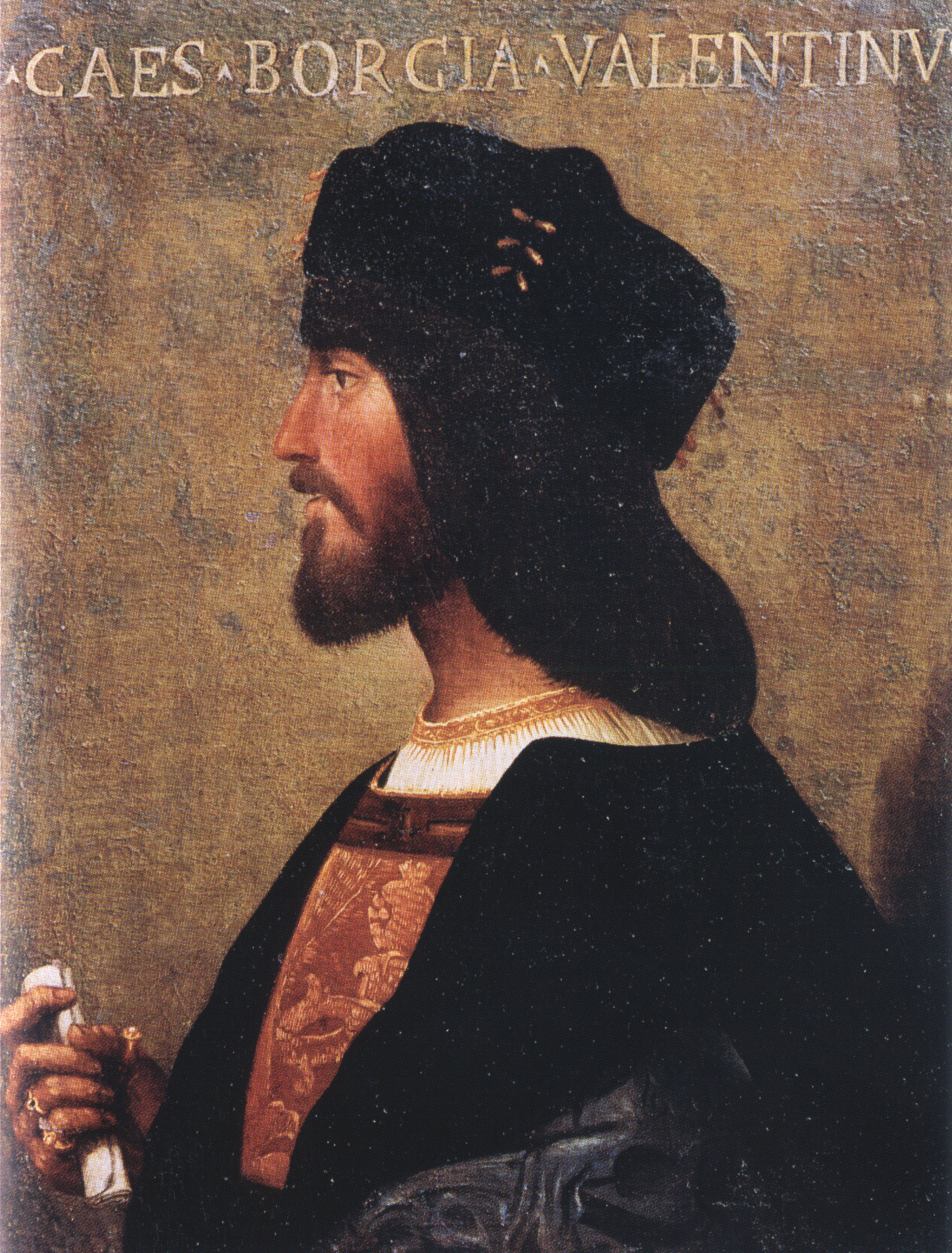
Cesare Borgia, son of Pope Alexander VI

- George Bariț – son of an Eastern-rite Catholic priest who once trained for the priesthood.
- Amy Coney Barrett, United States Supreme Court justice, daughter of a Catholic deacon.
- Cesare Borgia
- Lucrezia Borgia
- George Coșbuc – Romanian poet, 14 generations of his family were Eastern-rite priests including his father
- Pier Luigi Farnese, Duke of Parma
- John Fugelsang, actor and comedian, son of a Franciscan friar.
- Marcion of Sinope – son of the Bishop of Sinope, propagator of Marcionism, an early Christian heresy
- Pope Silverius – legitimate son of a pope
- Thomas I of York – Archbishop of York in Catholic era (Celibacy had become the rule, but was still haphazardly enforced.)

==== Eastern Orthodox ====
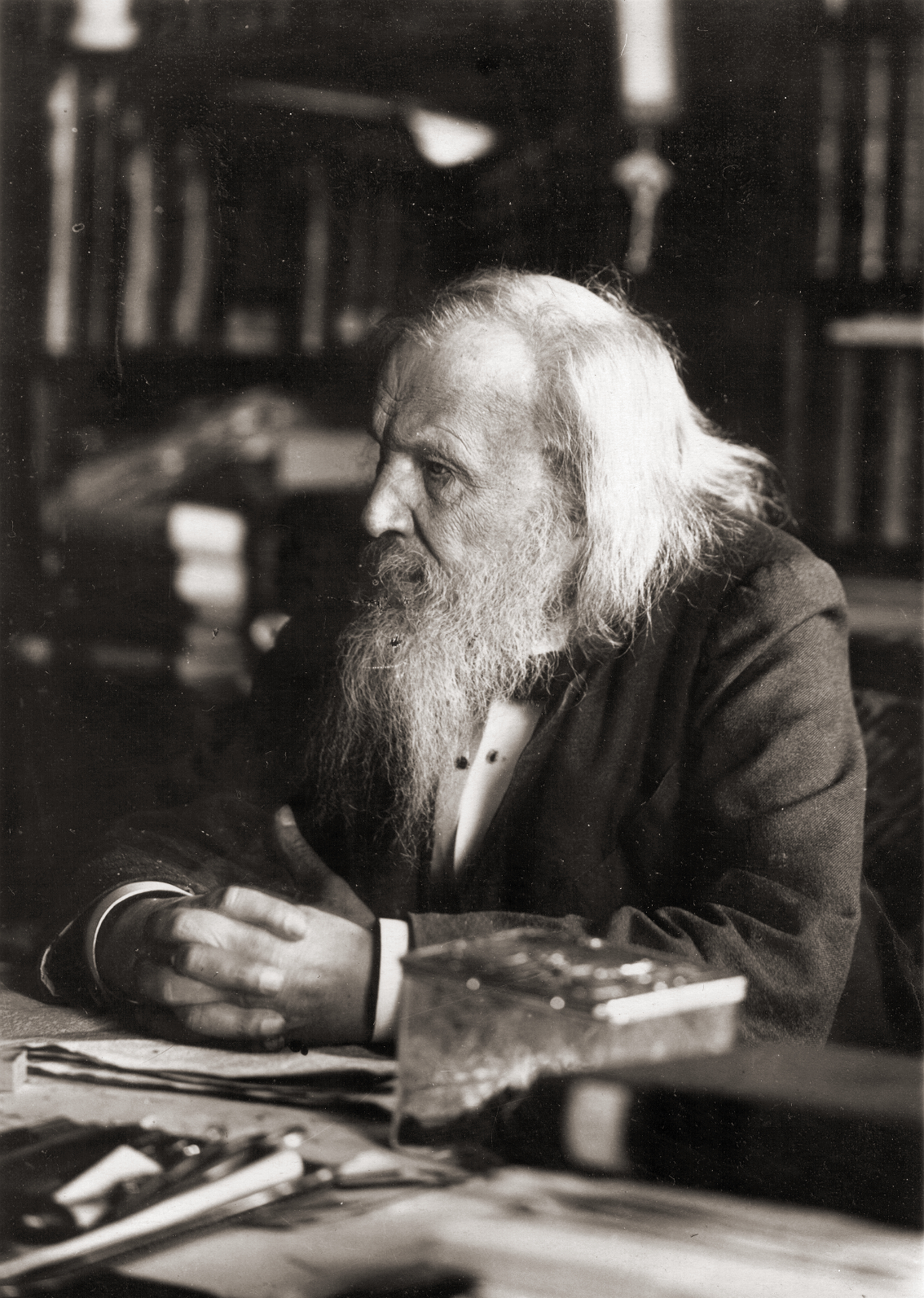
Dmitri Mendeleev, son of an Eastern Orthodox priest.

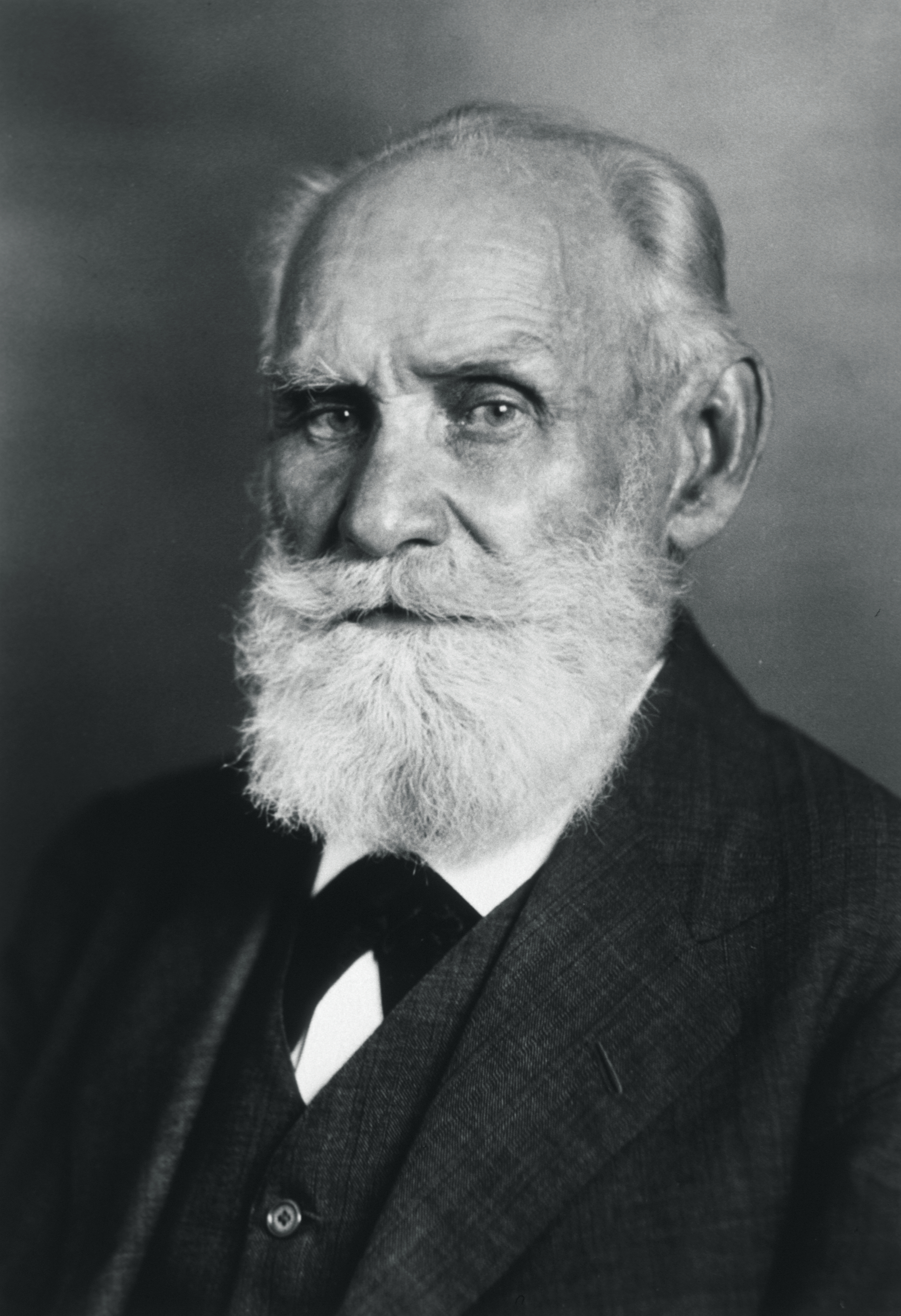
Ivan Pavlov, son of a village Russian Orthodox priest

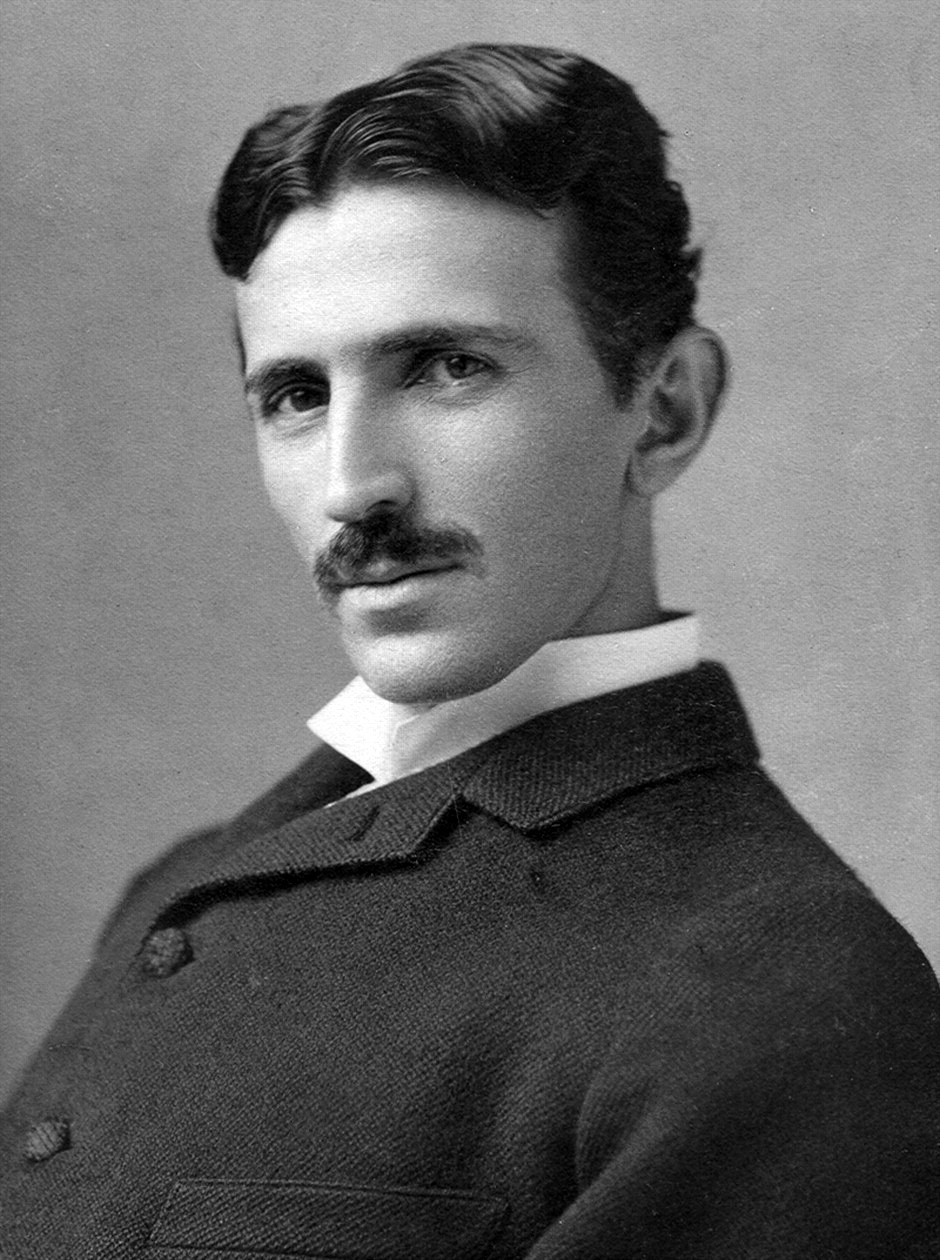
Nikola Tesla, son of a priest of the Eastern Orthodox Church

- Dmitri Mendeleev – Russian chemist and inventor. He is best remembered for formulating the Periodic Law and creating a farsighted version of the periodic table of elements.
- Nikolay Bogolyubov – Russian theoretical and mathematical physicist.
- Sergei Bulgakov – Russian theologian.
- Nikolai Chernyshevsky – Socialist thinker, writer, and materialist
- Cyriacus the Anchorite – saint in the Eastern Orthodox Church.
- Demetri Martin – comedian, served as an altar boy.
- Ivan Pavlov – Nobel Prize in Physiology or Medicine (1904), Scientist. H. G. Wells's autobiography indicates the Soviets tolerated his continued attendance at the Russian Orthodox Church.
- Stanislav Radonjić – Montenegrin governor
- Staniša Radonjić – Montenegrin serdar.
- George Stephanopoulos – former altar boy.
- Theophan the Recluse – saint in the Russian Orthodox Church
- Yevgeny Zamyatin – Bolshevik who initially supported the October Revolution
- Adrian Zmed – actor
- Justin Popović – Serbian theologian
- Miloš Milojević – Serbian writer and politician

==== Oriental Orthodoxy ====
- Abraham Kovoor – skeptic and atheist.

==== Protestant ====
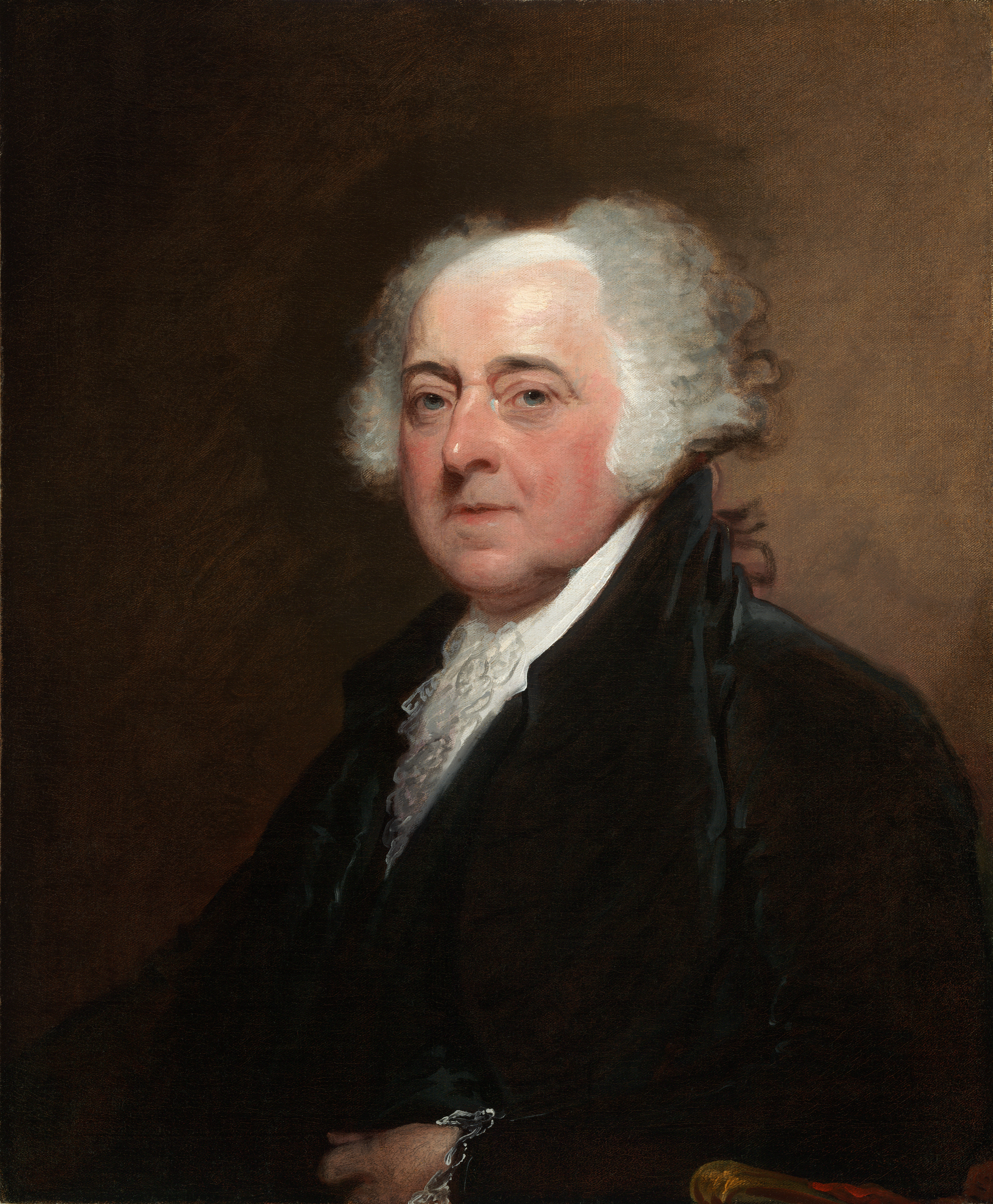
John Adams, son of a deacon in the Congregational Church

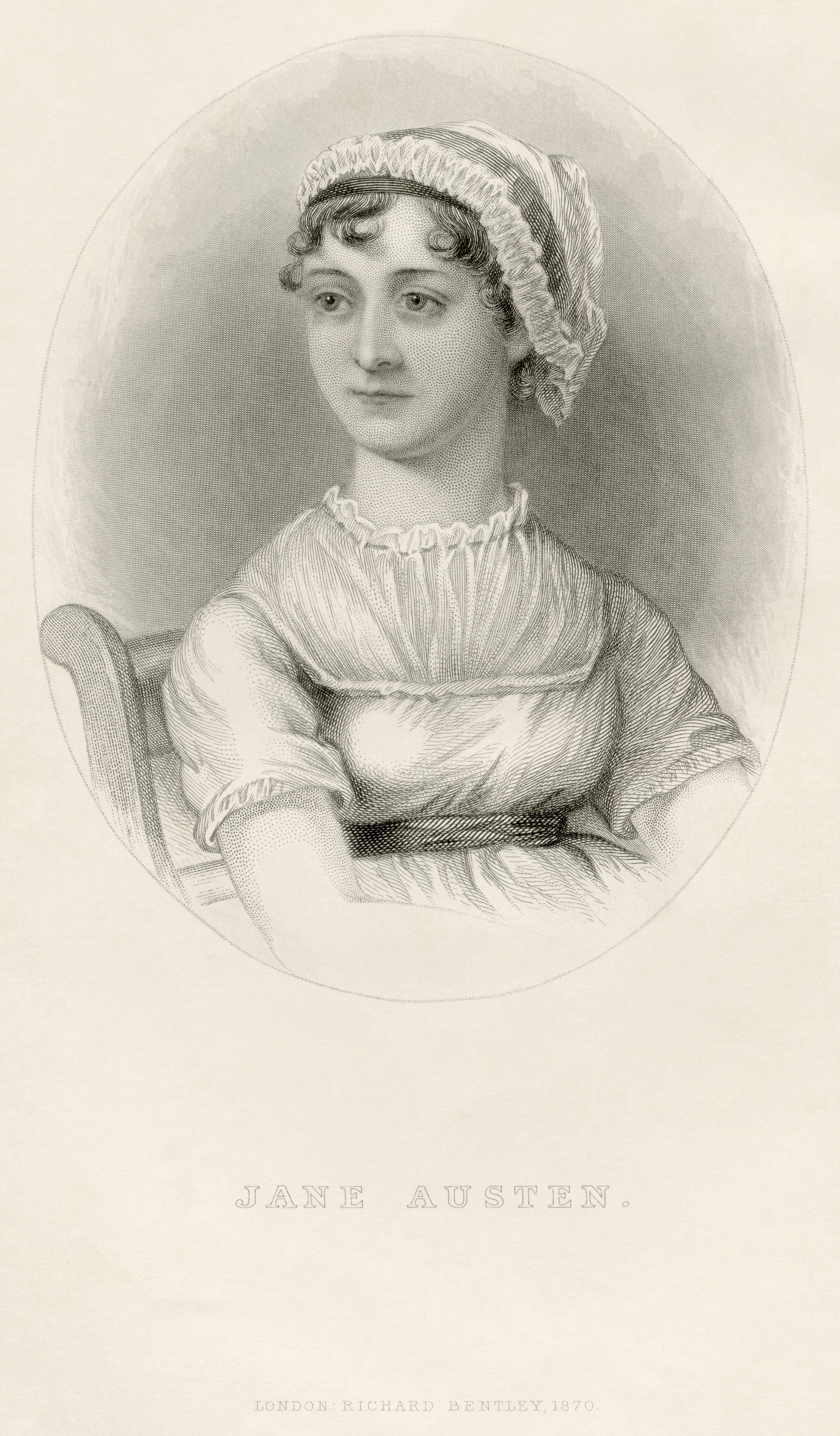
Jane Austen, daughter of an Anglican clergyman

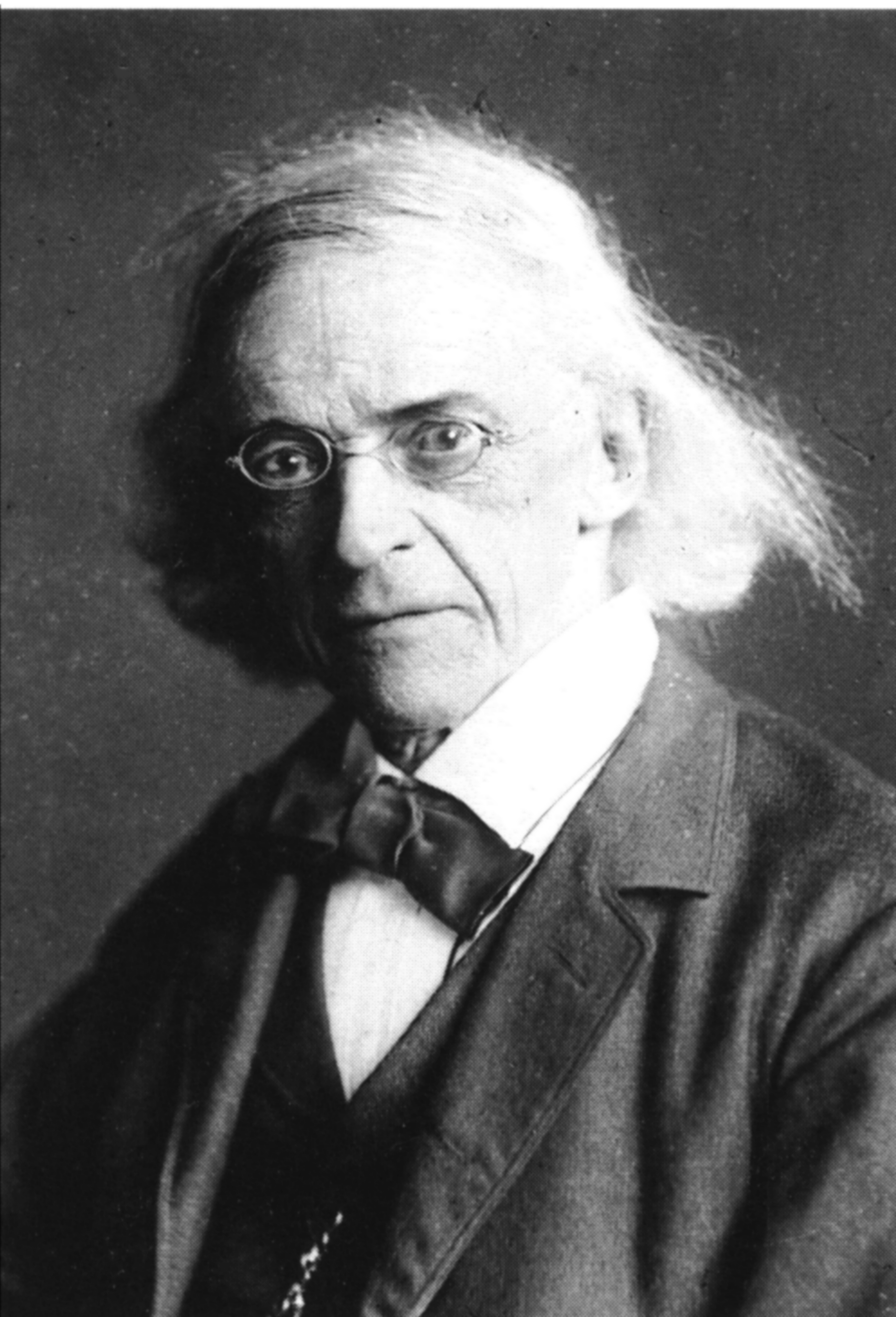
Theodor Mommsen, son of a Lutheran minister

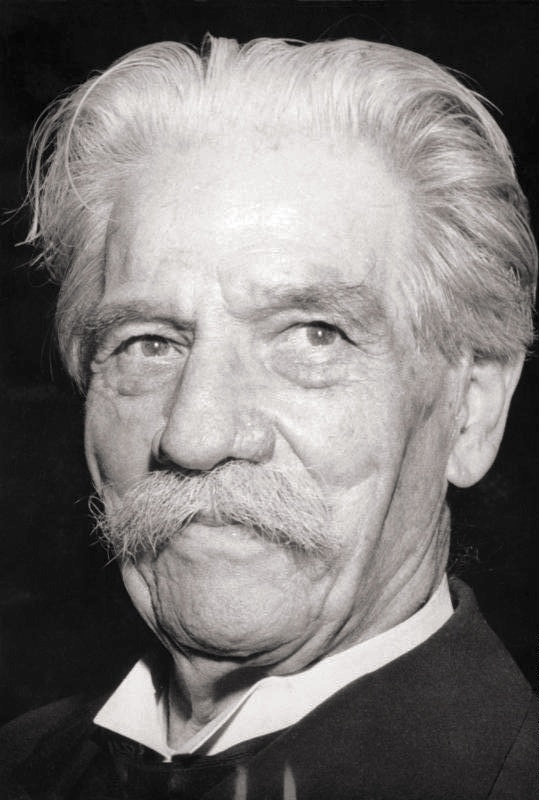
Albert Schweitzer, Son of a Lutheran-Evangelical pastor

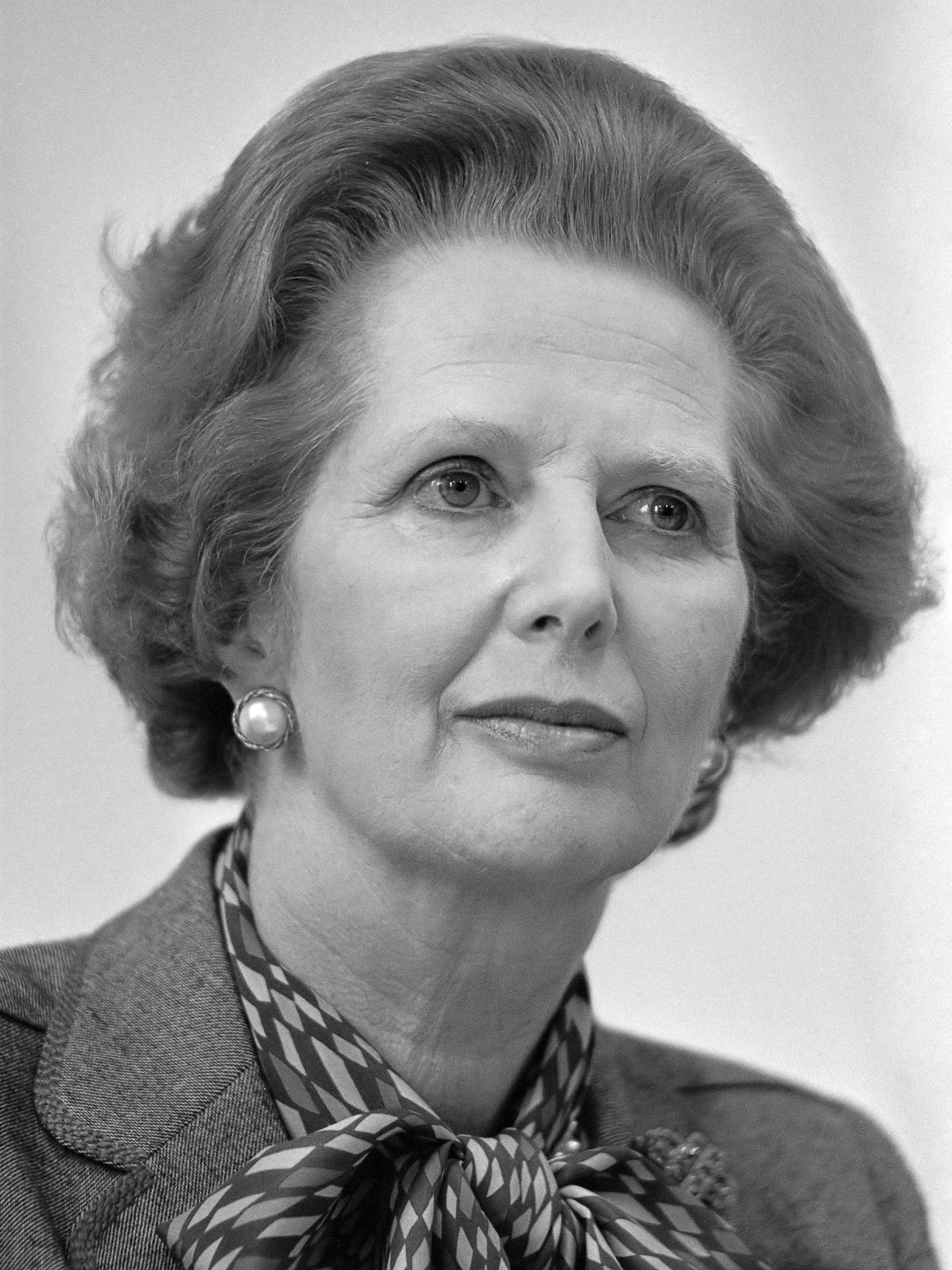
Margaret Thatcher, daughter of a Methodist pastor

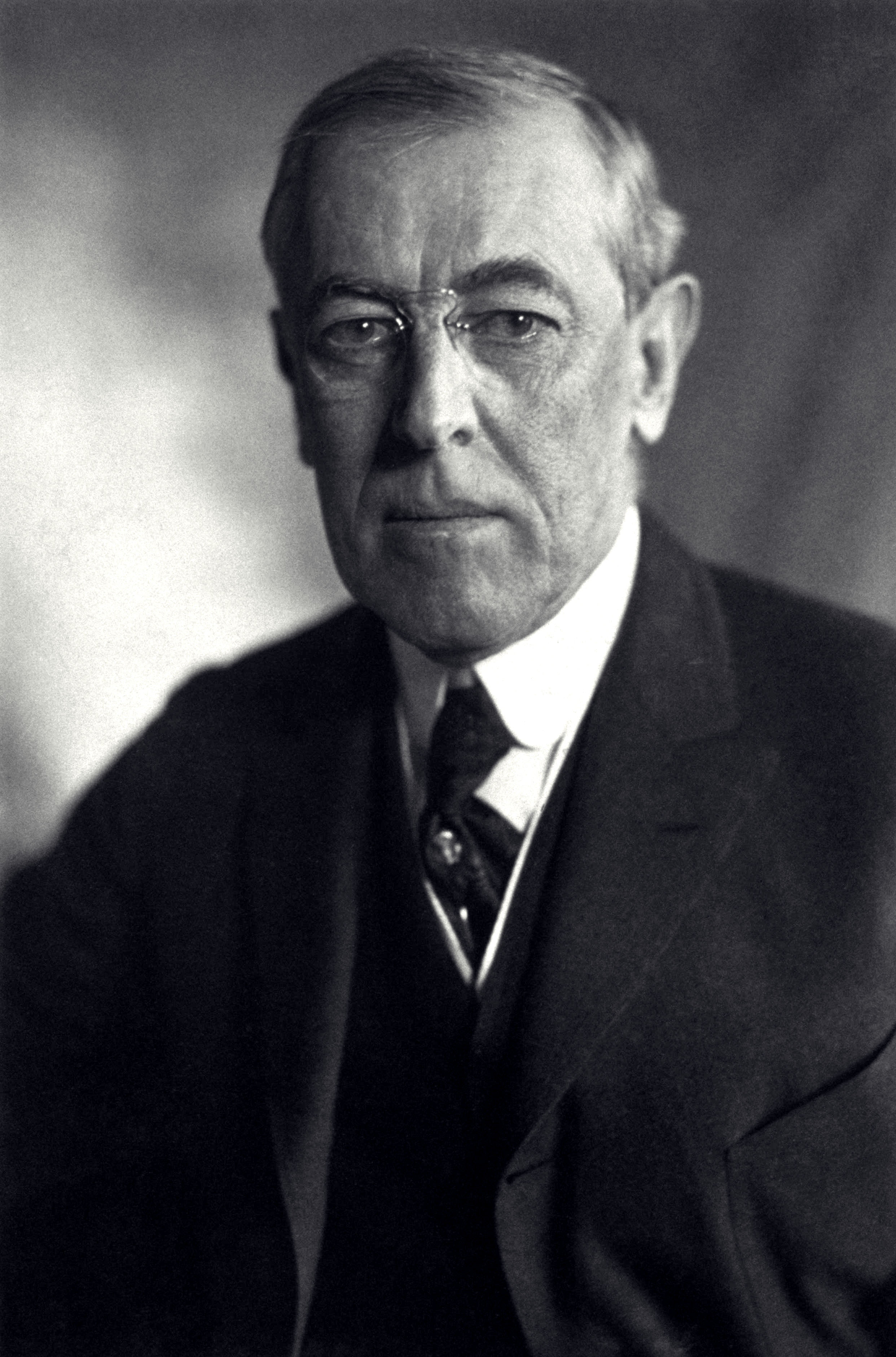
Woodrow Wilson, son of a Presbyterian theologian

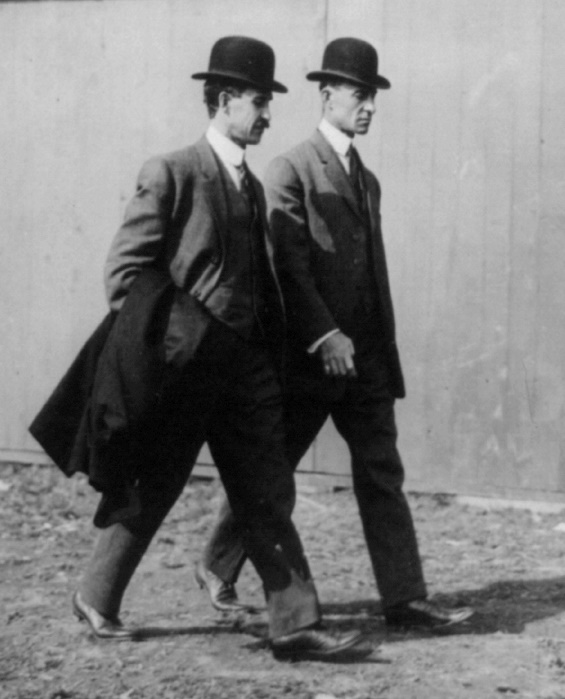
Wright Brothers – sons of a bishop in the Church of the United Brethren in Christ

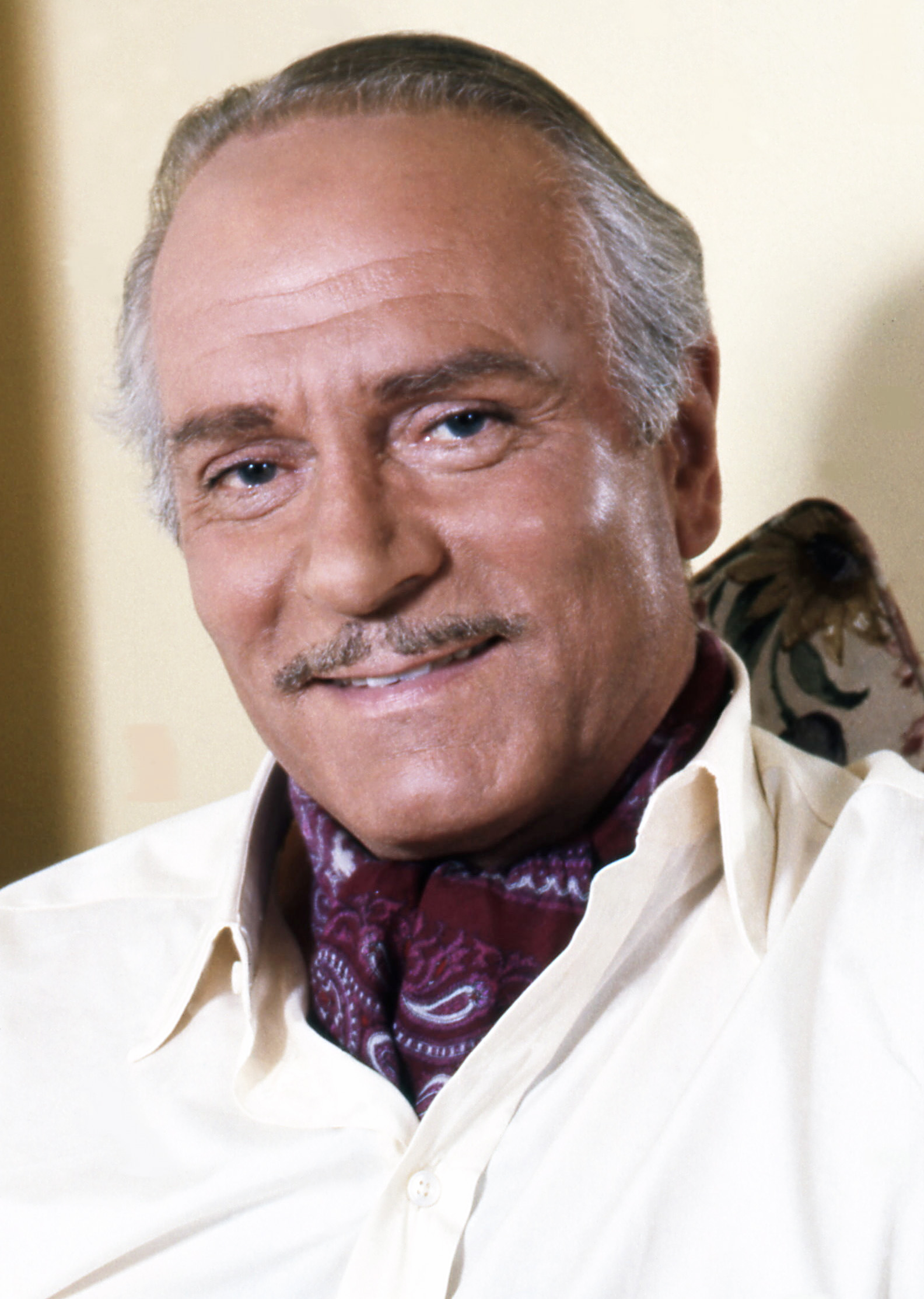
Laurence Olivier, son of a priest of the Church of England

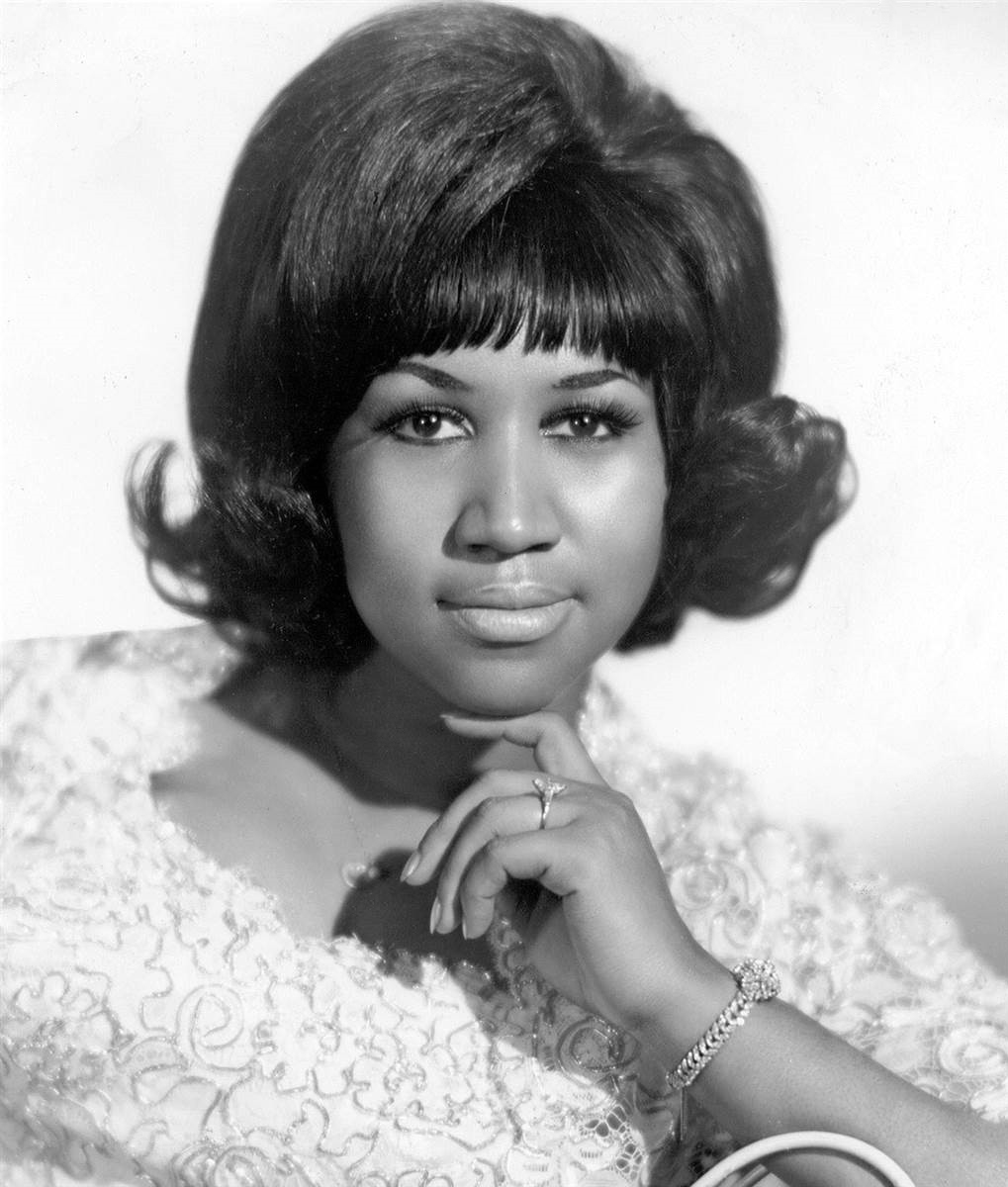
Aretha Franklin, daughter of a Baptist minister

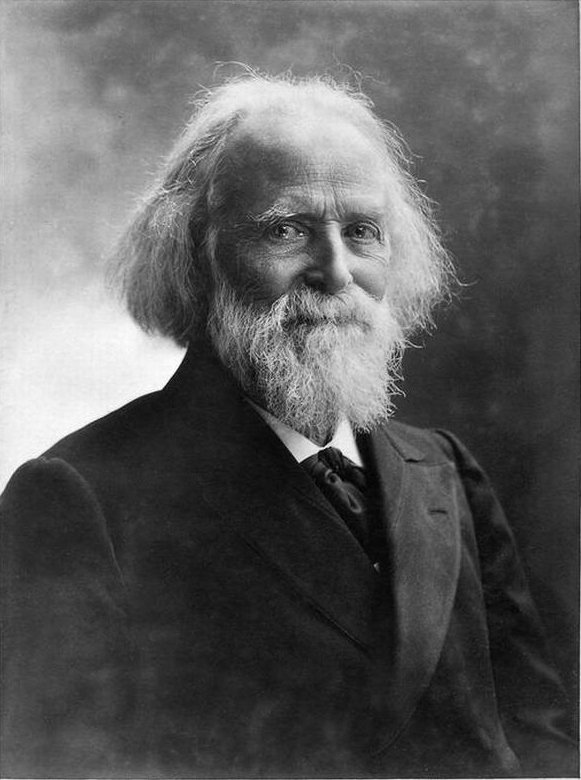
Élisée Reclus, son of a Protestant pastor

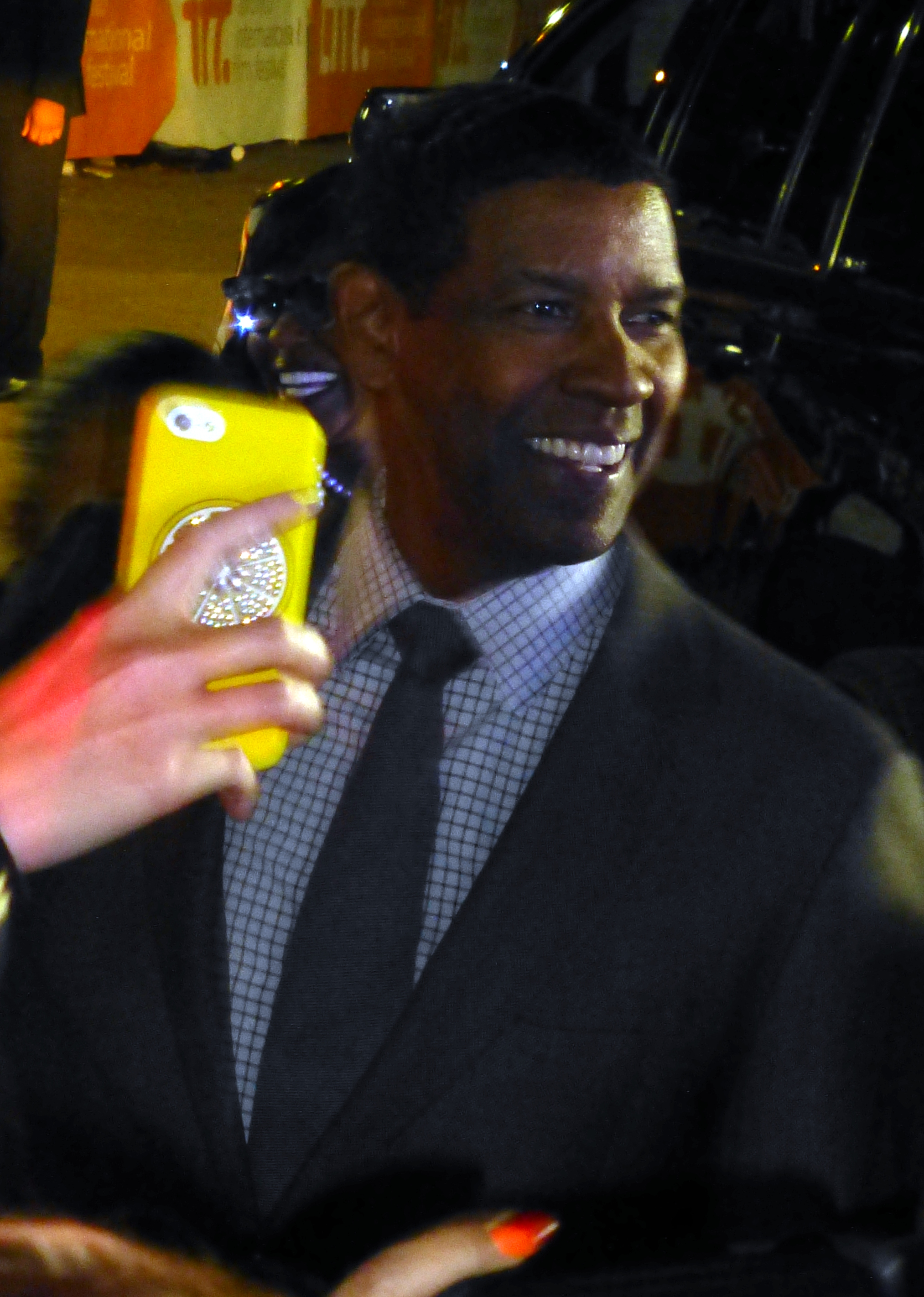
Denzel Washington, son of an ordained Pentecostal minister

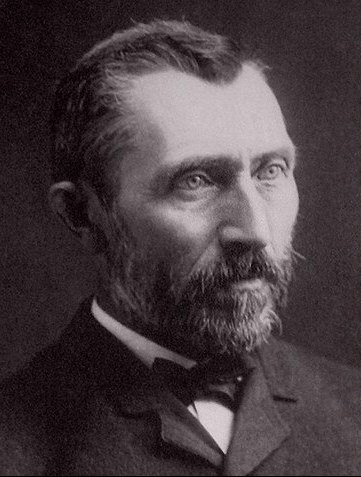
Vincent van Gogh, son of a minister of the Dutch Reformed Church

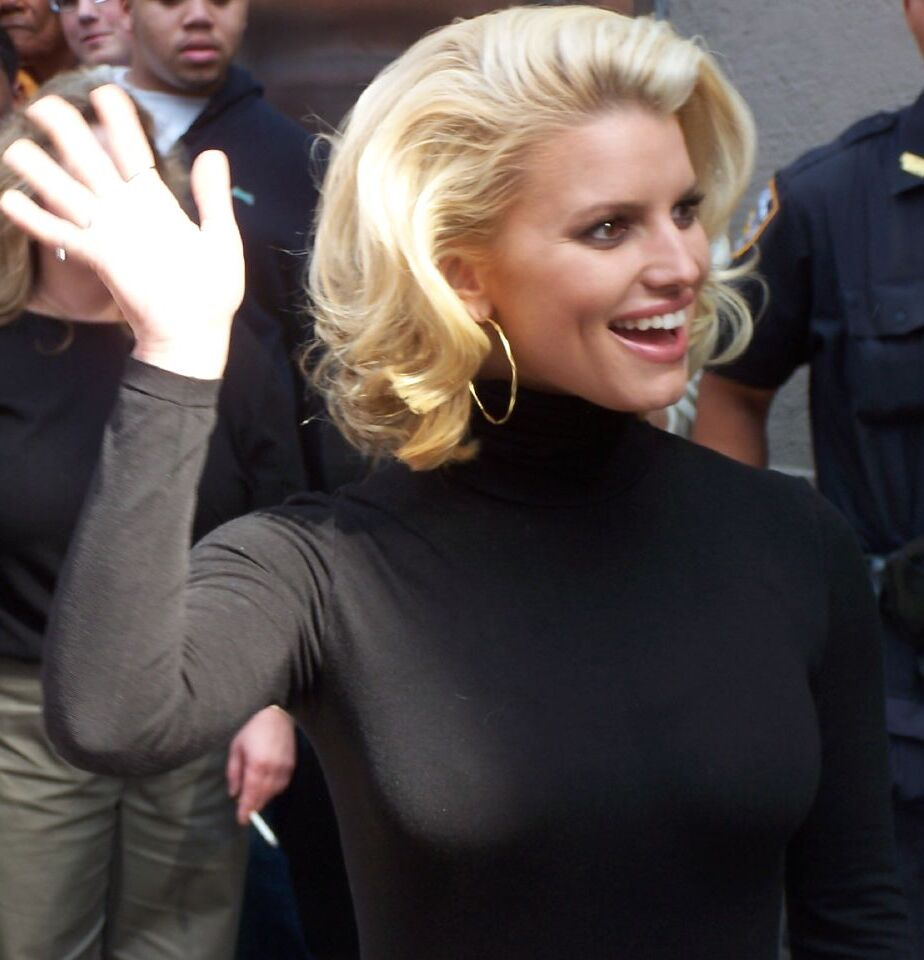
Jessica Simpson, daughter of a Baptist minister

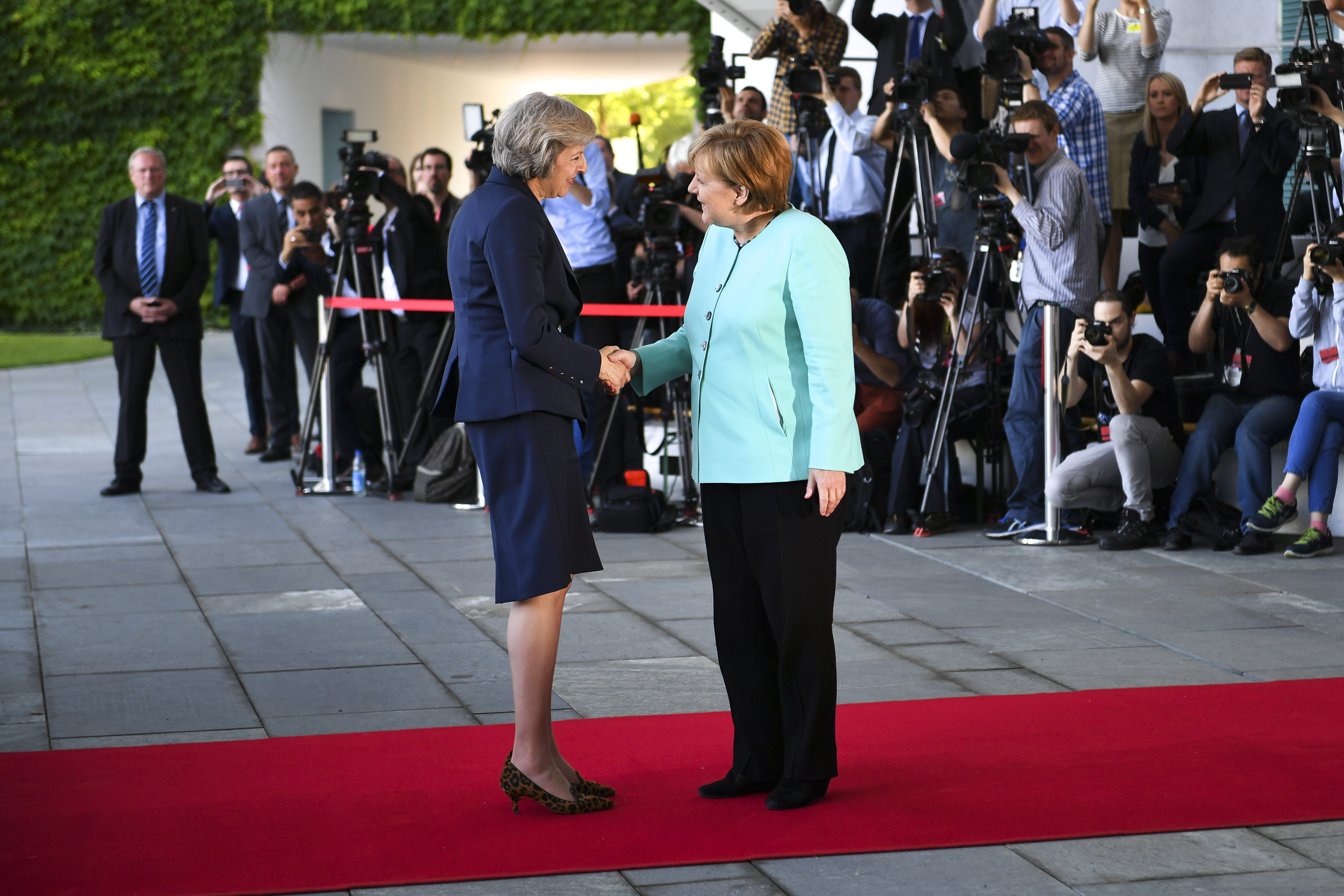
Angela Merkel, daughter of a Lutheran pastor, Theresa May, daughter of a Church of England clergyman

- John Adams – American Founding Father.
- Roy Acuff – American country music singer, fiddler and promoter. Known as the "King of Country Music."
- Stacey Abrams – American politician, lawyer, voting rights activist, and author. Both her parents are Methodist ministers.
- Max Aitken, Lord Beaverbrook – Canadian-British business tycoon, politician, and writer.
- John Abernethy (minister)
- Sophia Akuffo – Chief Justice of Ghana (2017–19), daughter of a Presbyterian minister
- Alasdair MacMhaighstir Alasdair – taught by his minister father and taught for the SPCK for a time.
- Douglas Alexander - Scottish MP, son of Church of Scotland minister (along with sister, Wendy).
- Wendy Alexander - Scottish MP, son of Church of Scotland minister (along with brother, Alexander).
- Tori Amos, Crucify (song) and "Icicle" deal overtly with the background as do others.
- Garner Ted Armstrong – son of Herbert W. Armstrong who was disfellowed by him.
- Matthew Arnold – poet and educationist, son of Revd. Thomas Arnold
- Chester A. Arthur – President of the United States, son of a Baptist minister.
- John Ashcroft – father was an Assemblies of God congregation minister.
- Jane Austen – English novelist; daughter of George Austen, an Anglican clergyman. Her maternal grandfather and her brother James were also clergymen.
- Christopher Awdry – English author who continued The Railway Series of books featuring Thomas the Tank Engine first created by his father Rev. Wilbert Awdry
- Joan Bridge Baez and Albert Baez – parents of peace activist and folksinger Joan Baez were both children of clergy who themselves became Quakers.
- Robert Baden-Powell – founder of international Scouting movement.
- John Baillie, and brother Donald Macpherson Baillie – prominent Scottish theologians, a third brother Peter Baillie, was a missionary in India. All were sons of Free Church of Scotland Minister John Baillie.
- John Logie Baird – was a Scottish engineer, innovator, one of the inventors of the mechanical television, was the youngest of four children of the Reverend John Baird, the Church of Scotland's minister for the local St Bride's Church and Jessie Morrison Inglis, the orphaned niece of a wealthy family of shipbuilders from Glasgow.
- Jay Bakker – founder of LGBT-friendly Revolution Church, son of televangelist Jim Bakker and evangelist and TV personality Tammy Faye Messner.
- James Baldwin – raised by his stepfather who was a preacher and his novel Go Tell it on the Mountain relates to this.
- John Barron (journalist) – son of a Methodist minister who investigated Communists.
- Karl Barth – Swiss Reformed theologian whom critics hold to be among the most important Christian thinkers of the 20th century.
- Pierre Bayle – French writer and philosopher. Son of a pastor in the French Reformed Church.
- Robert Hugh Benson – Son of Edward White Benson, the Archbishop of Canterbury, his conversion to Catholicism while an Anglican priest caused a sensation. An English author, several of siblings including A. C. Benson, E. F. Benson, and Margaret Benson were also authors.
- Barney Bentall – Canadian pop/rock singer-songwriter.
- J. D. Beresford – agnostic, The Hampdenshire Wonder contains an unflattering minister character.
- Sir Francis Bernard, 1st Baronet – British Governor of New Jersey and Massachusetts Bay.
- Ingmar Bergman – noted atheist, son of a Lutheran minister.
- Crystal Bernard – actress and singer. Daughter of a Baptist televangelist who travelled across the United States preaching and singing.
- Joh Bjelke-Petersen – Premier of Queensland, son of a Lutheran pastor
- Todd Blanche, United States Attorney General, son of a pastor.
- William Henry Bliss – convert to Catholicism who worked at the Vatican.
- John Bost – French Protestant minister. Father was a minister.
- John Boyega – Finn in the Star Wars sequel trilogy.
  Grover Cleveland, son of a congregational minister
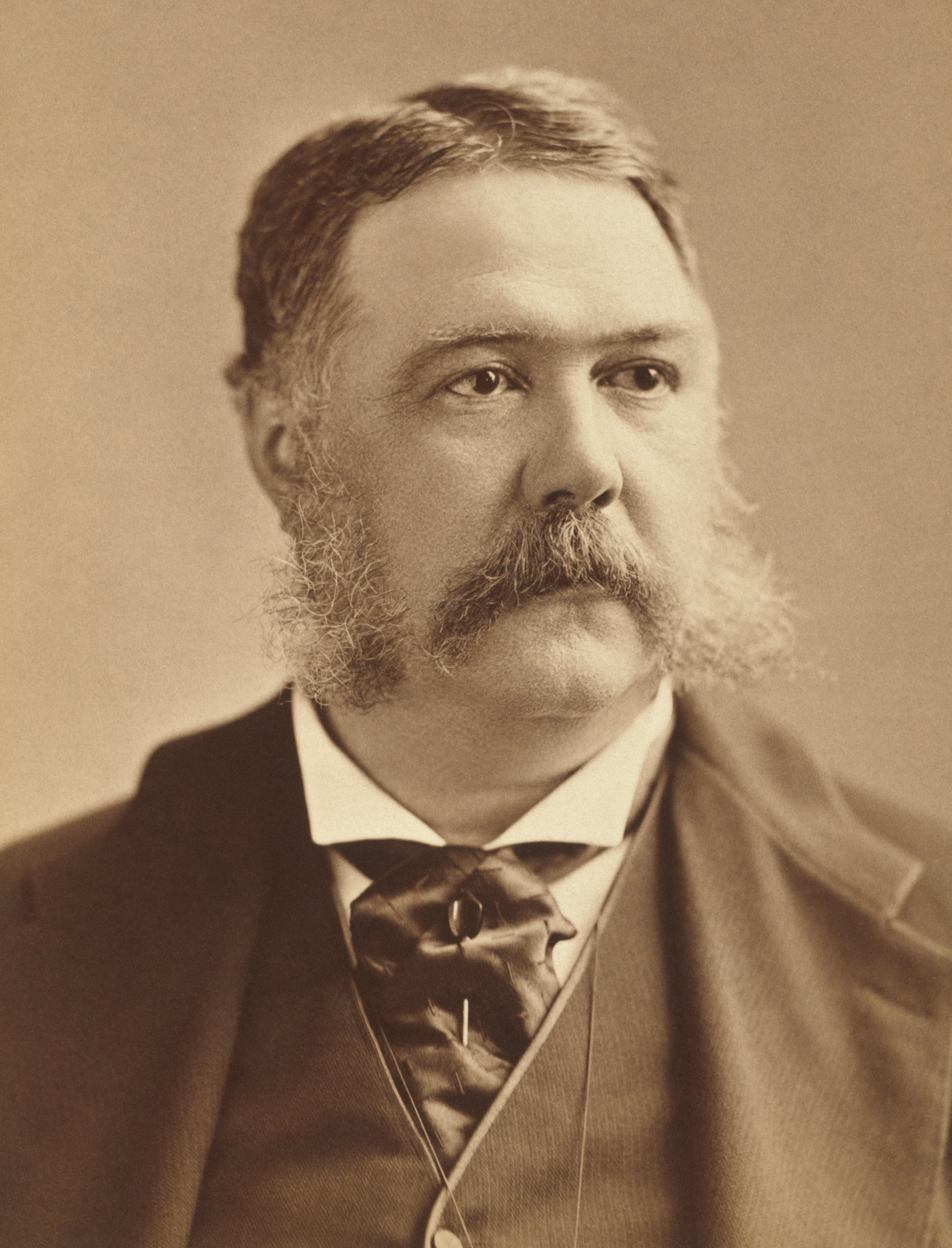
  Chester A. Arthur, son of a Baptist minister
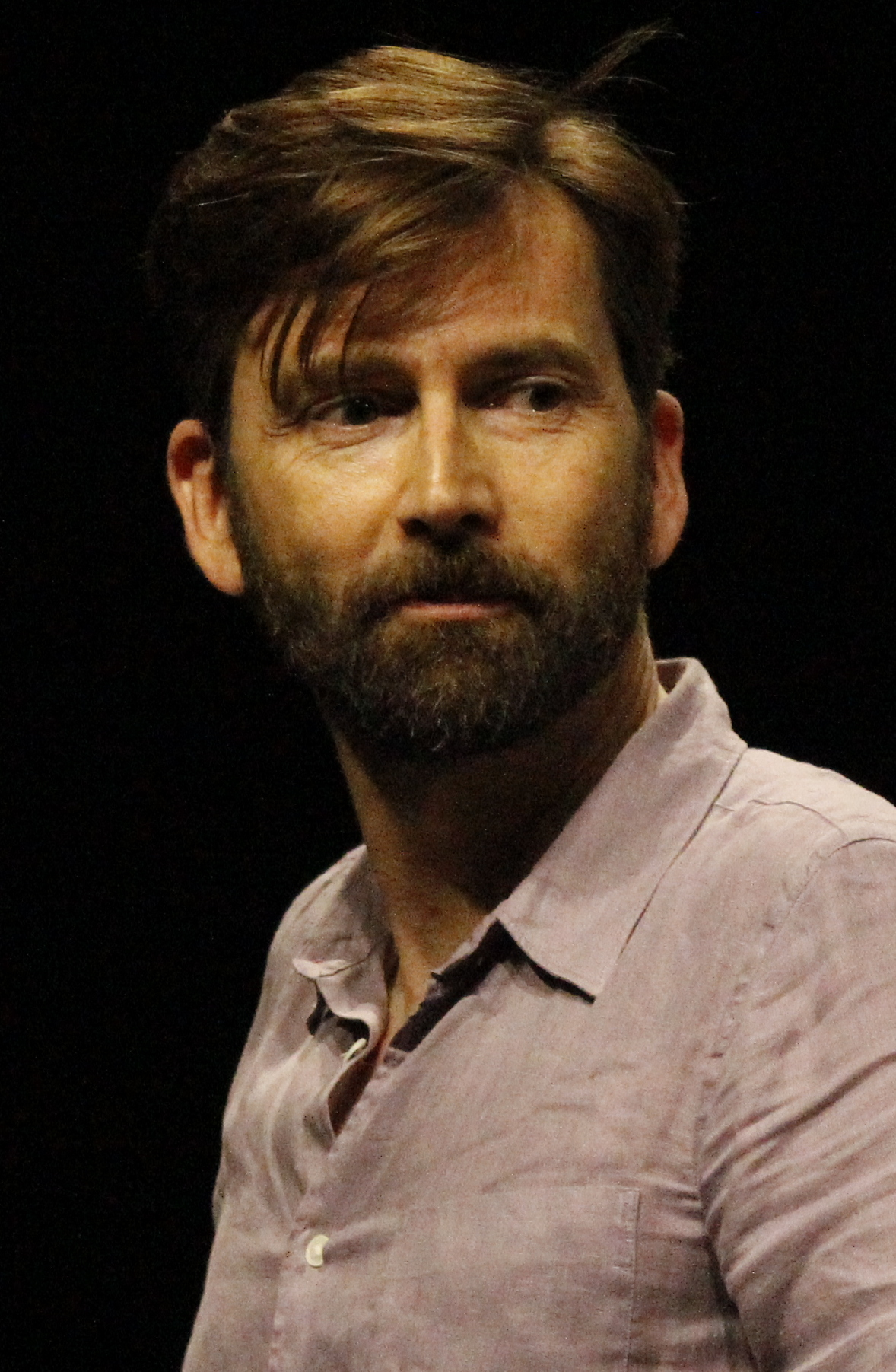
  David Tennant, son of a minister of the Church of Scotland
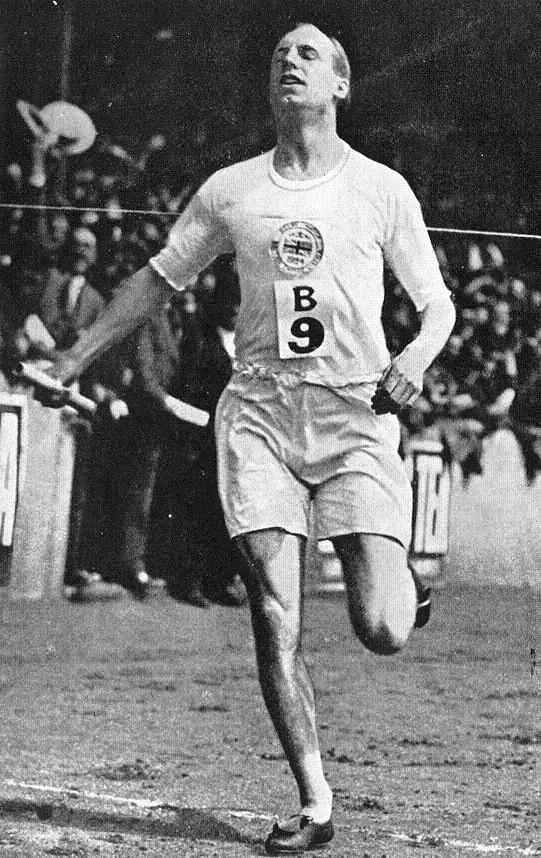
  Eric Liddell, son of a Scottish missionary
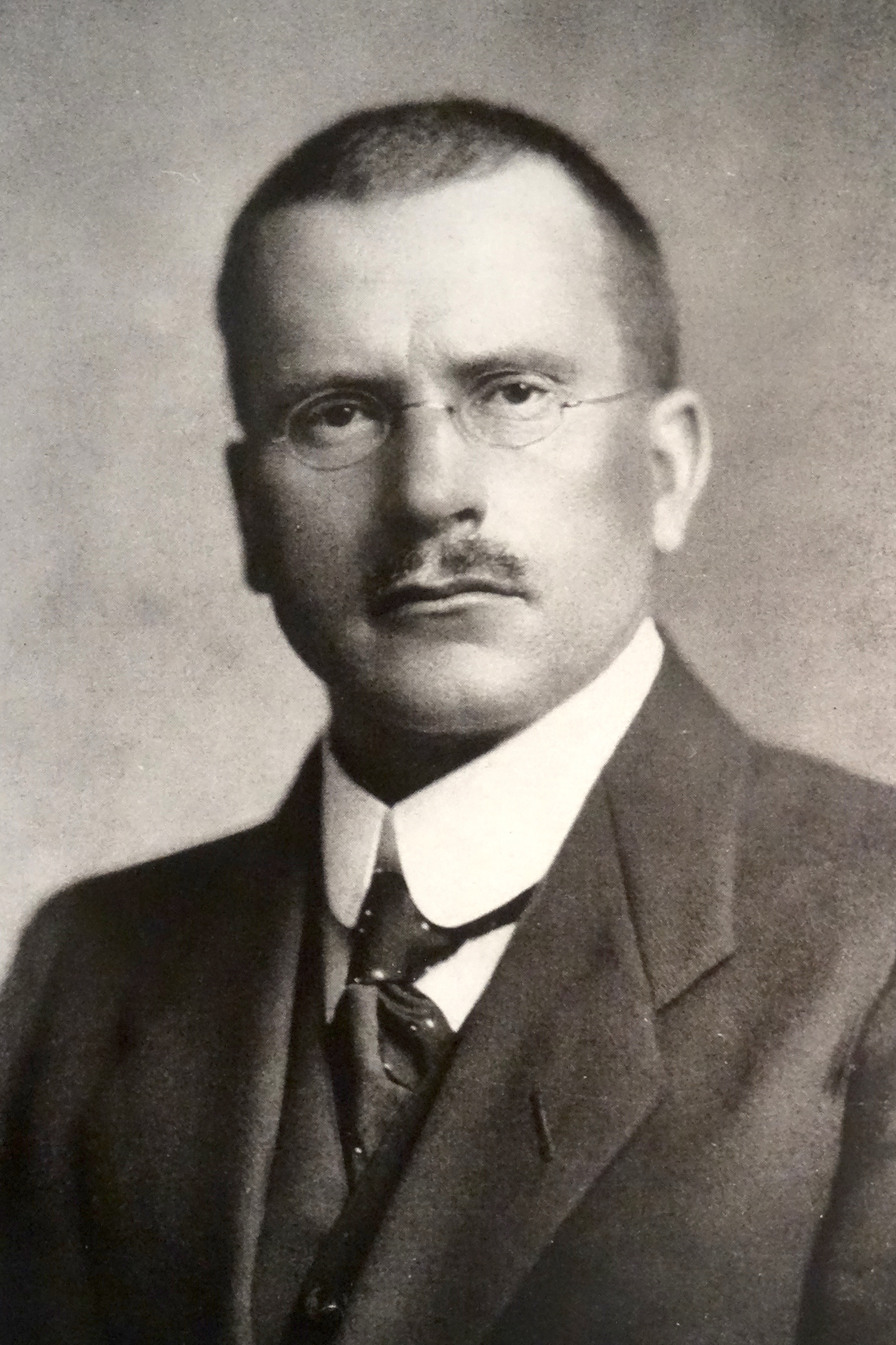
  Carl Jung, son of a pastor in the Swiss Reformed Church
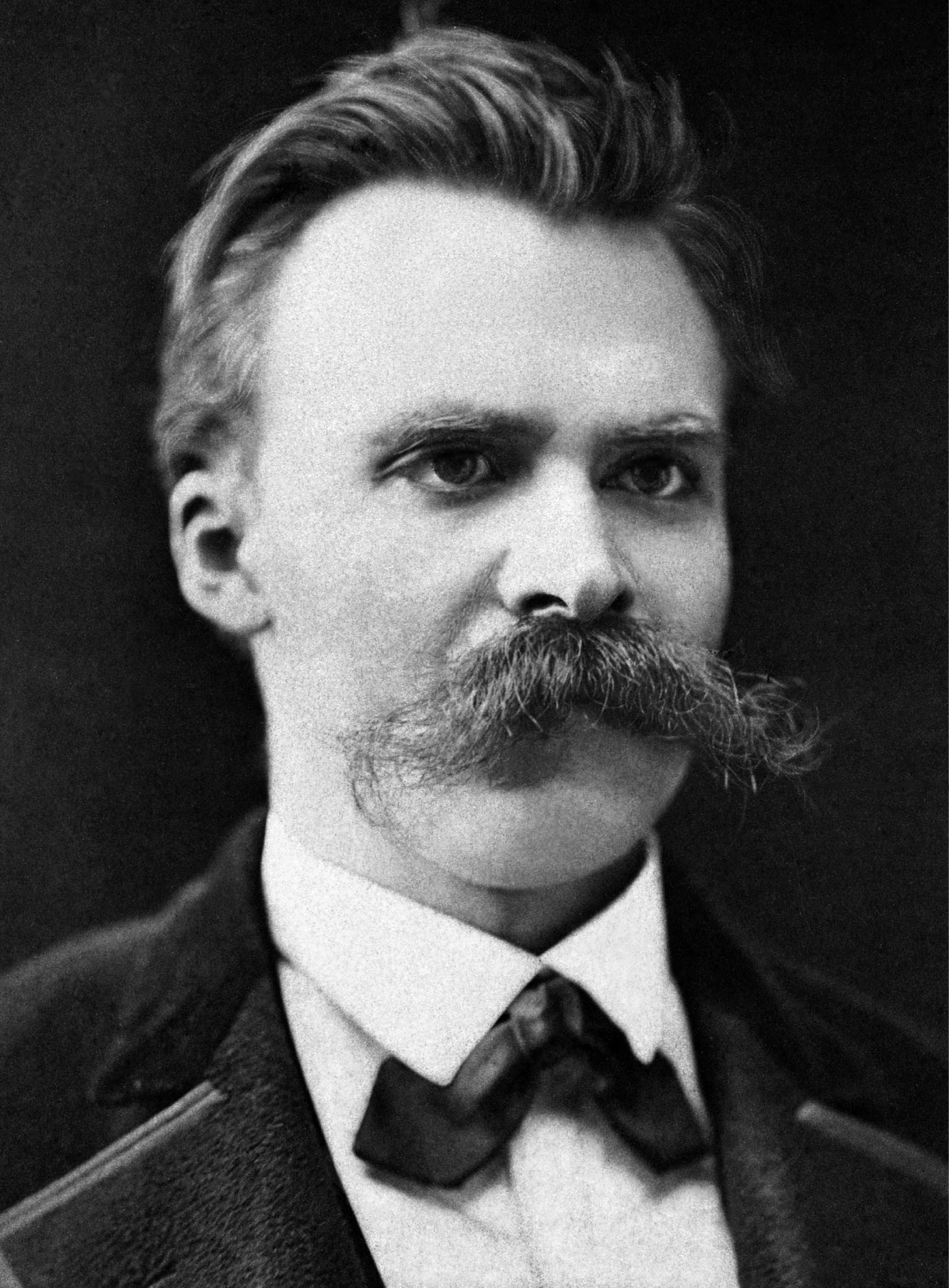
  Friedrich Nietzsche, son of a Lutheran pastor
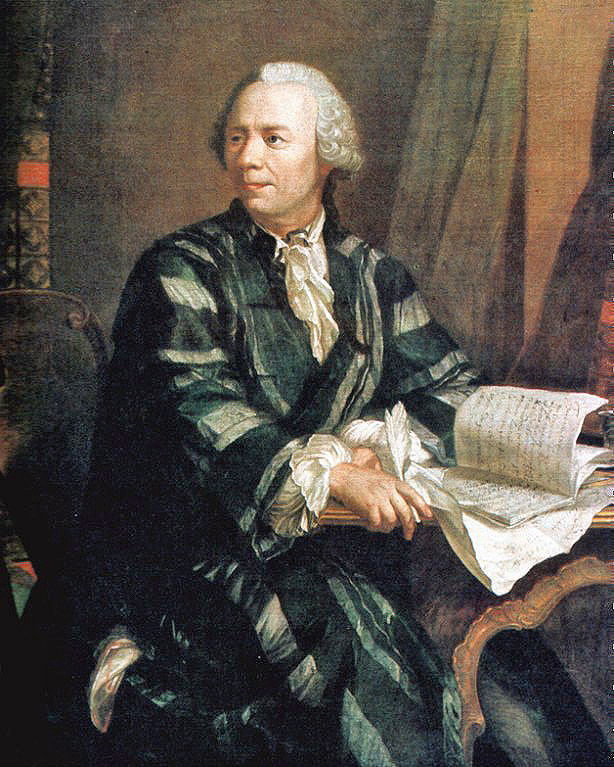
  Leonhard Euler, son of a pastor of the Reformed Church
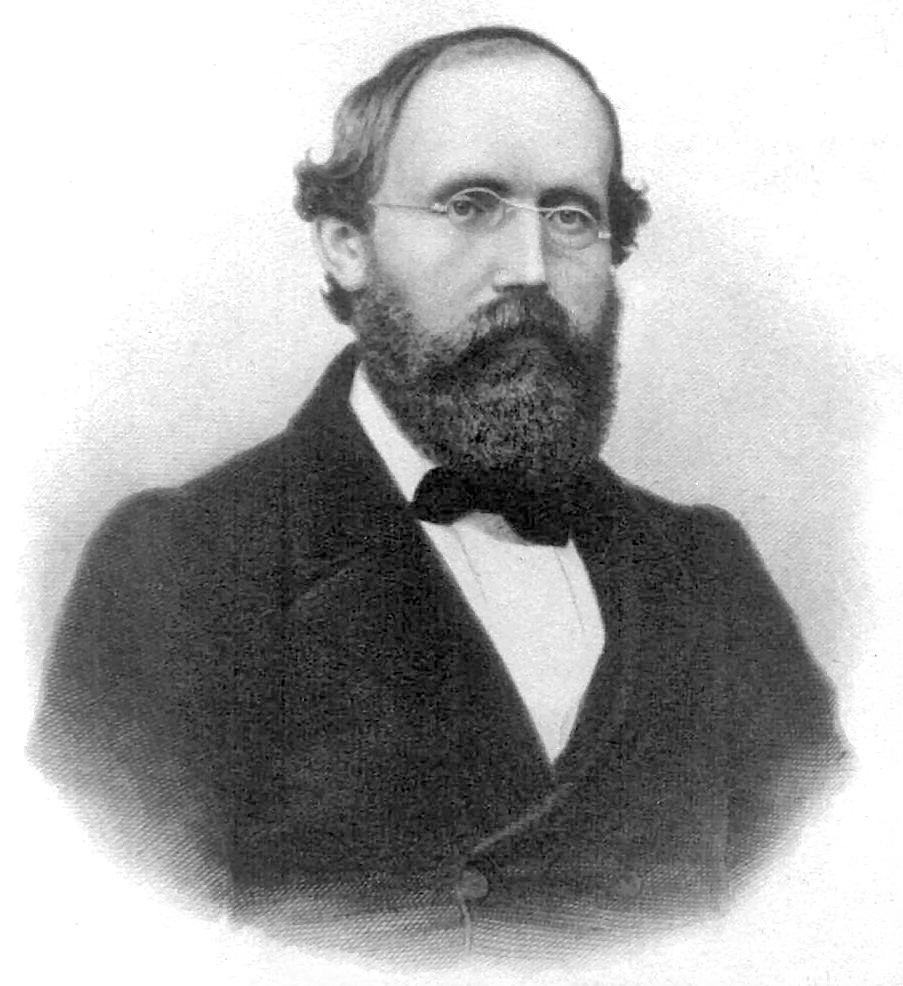
  Bernhard Riemann, son of a Lutheran pastor
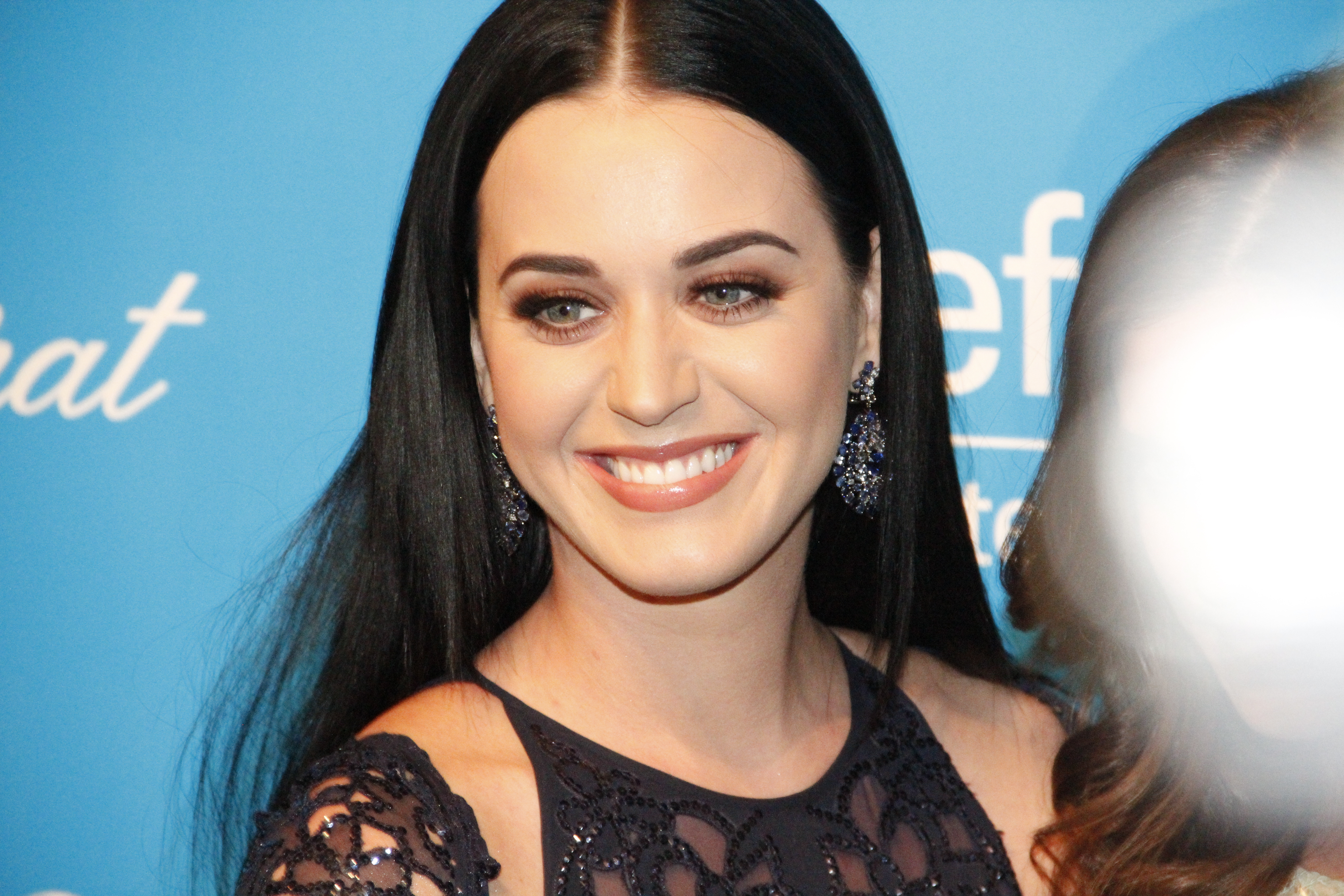
  Katy Perry, a daughter of a Pentecostal pastor
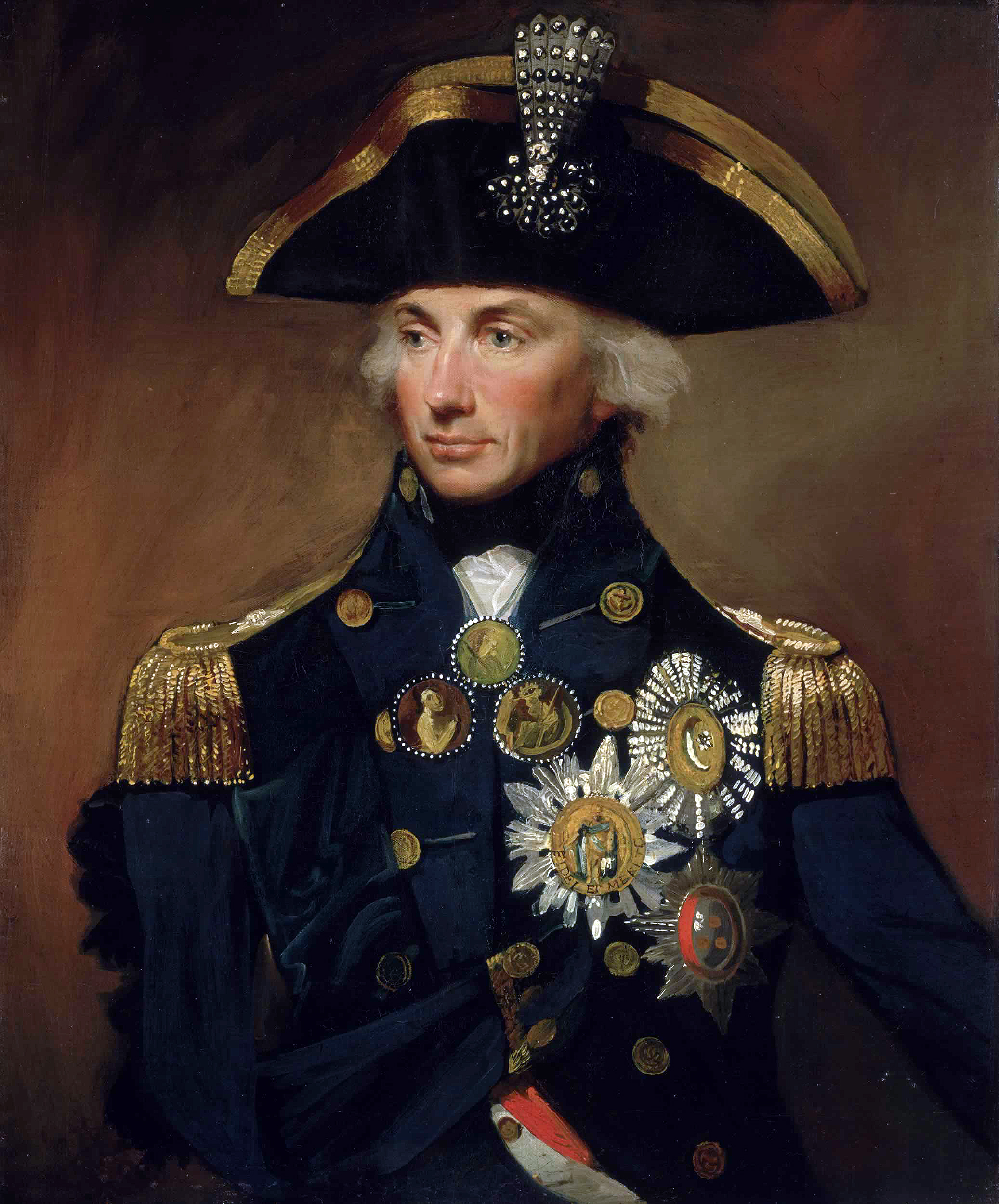
  Horatio Nelson, 1st Viscount Nelson, son of a British priest
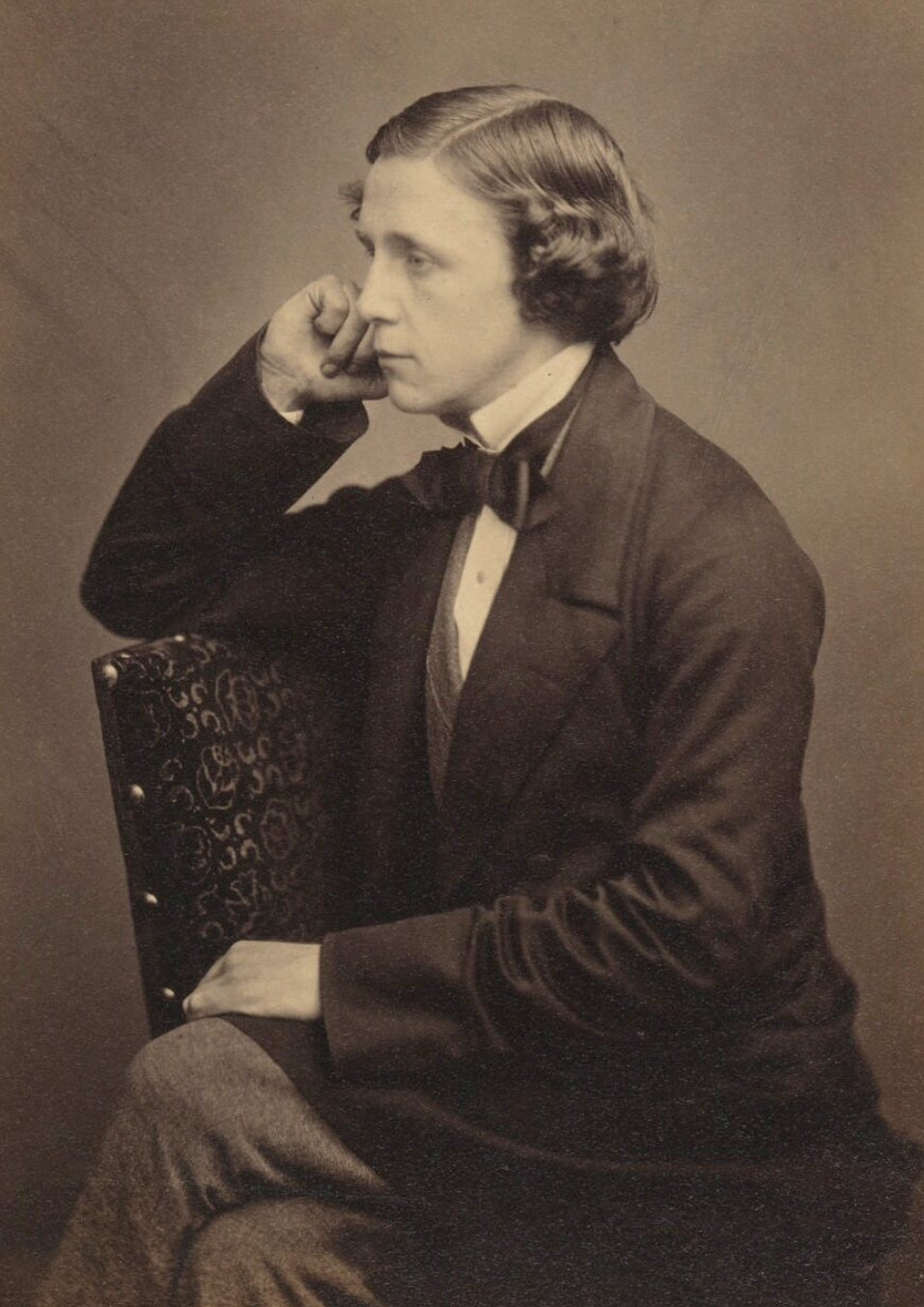
  Lewis Carroll, son of a cleric of the Church of England
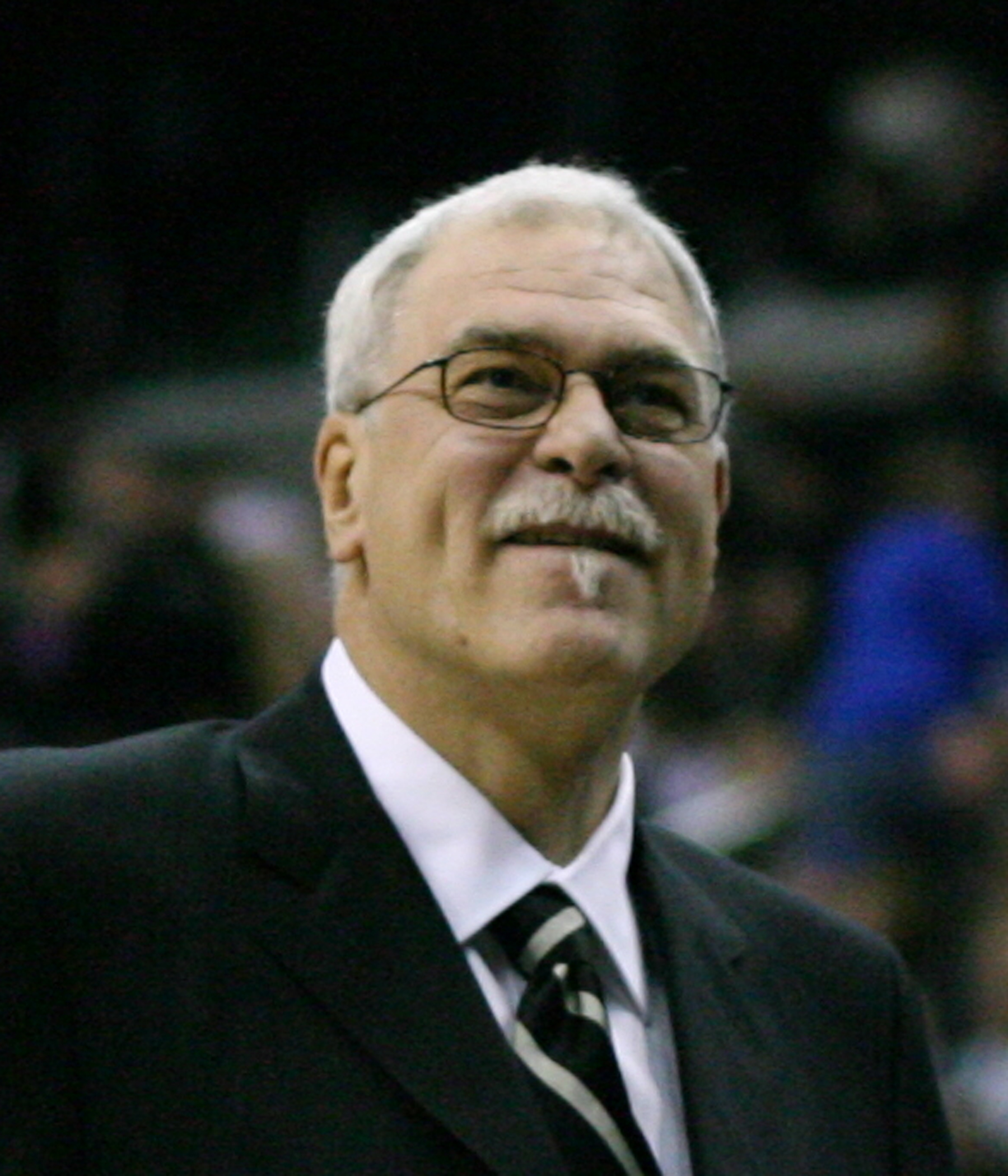
  Phil Jackson, son of a Assemblies of God minister
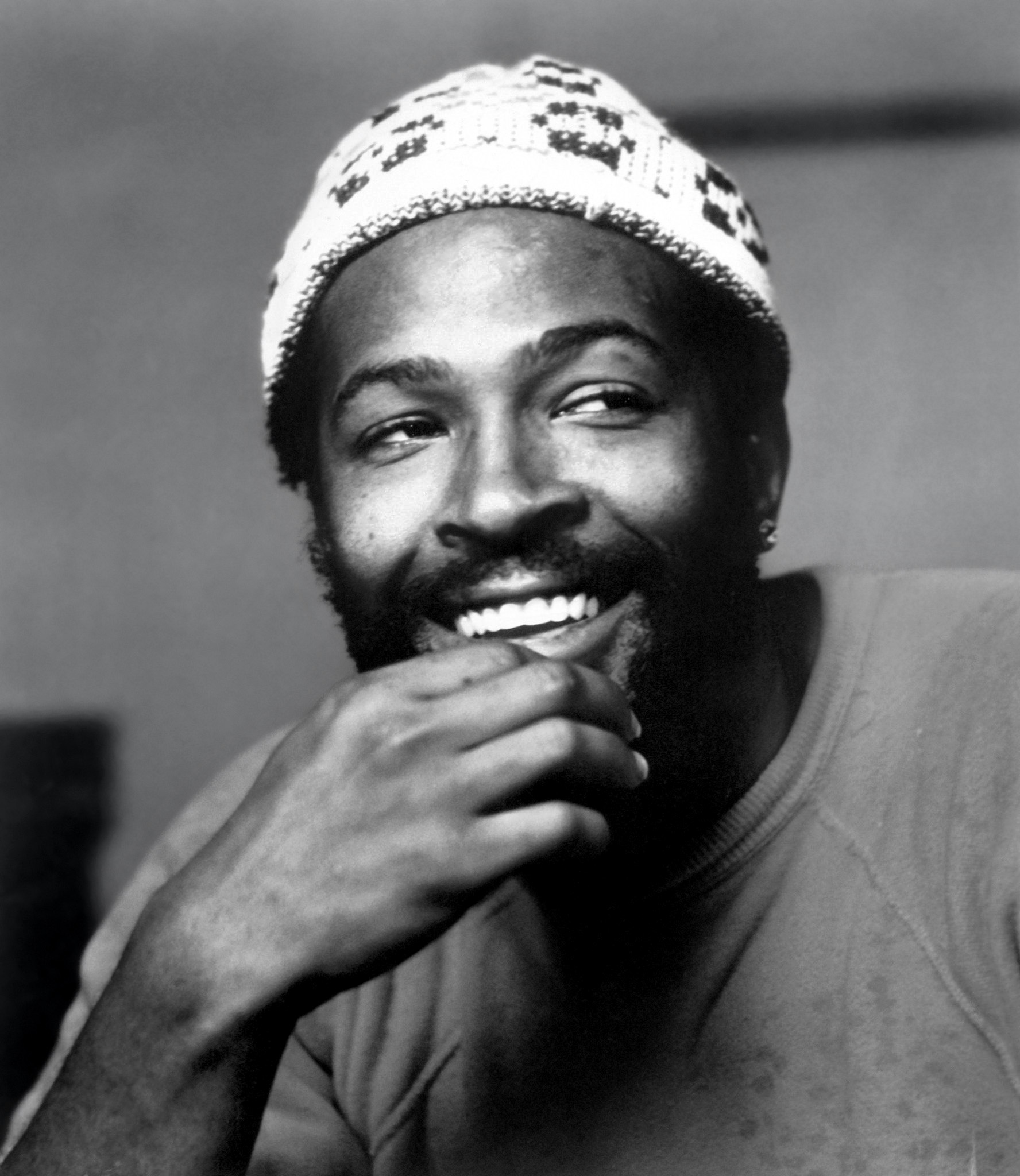
  Marvin Gaye, son of a church minister
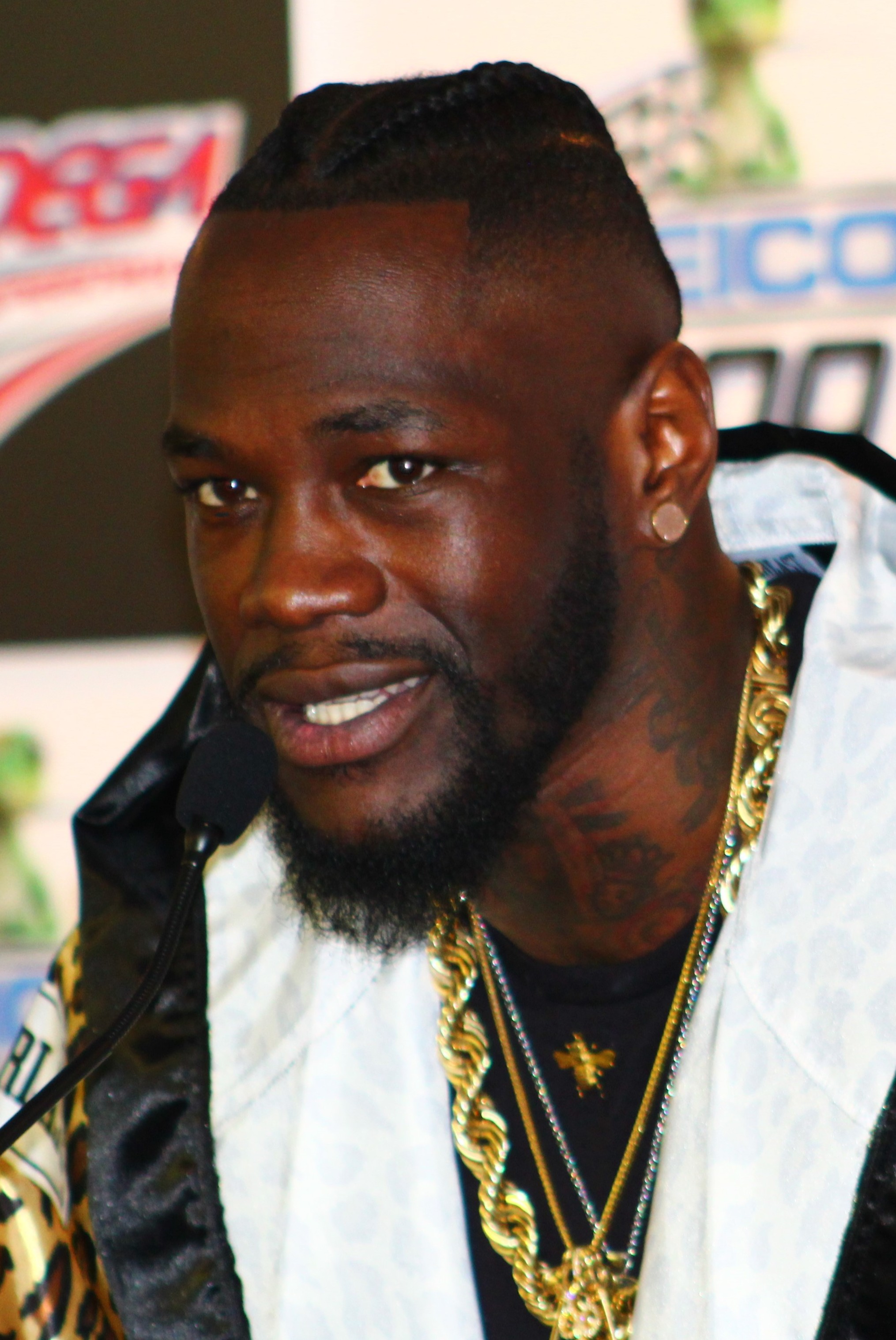
  Deontay Wilder, son of a preacher in Alabama
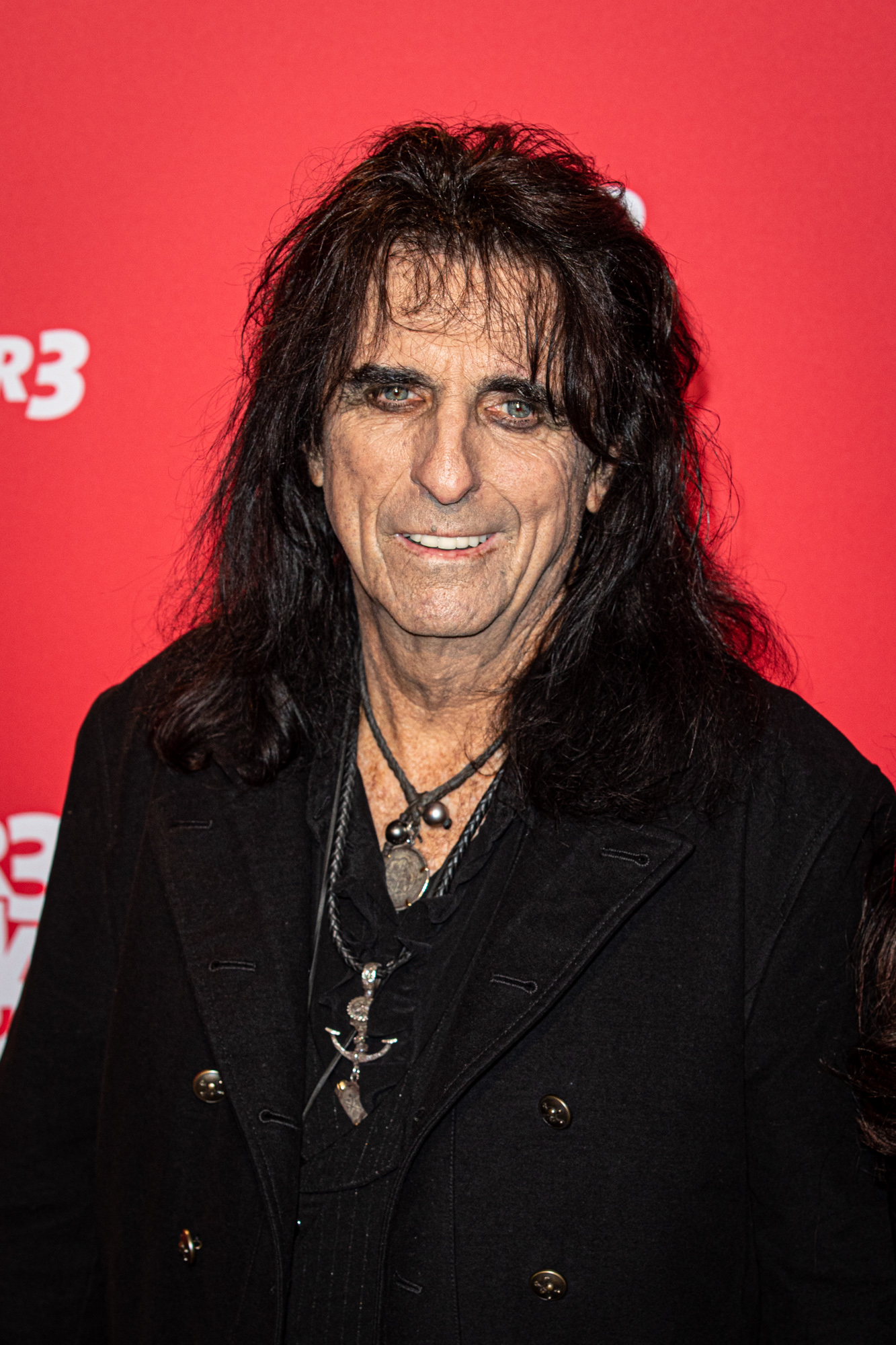
  Alice Cooper, son of an evangelist in The Church of Jesus Christ
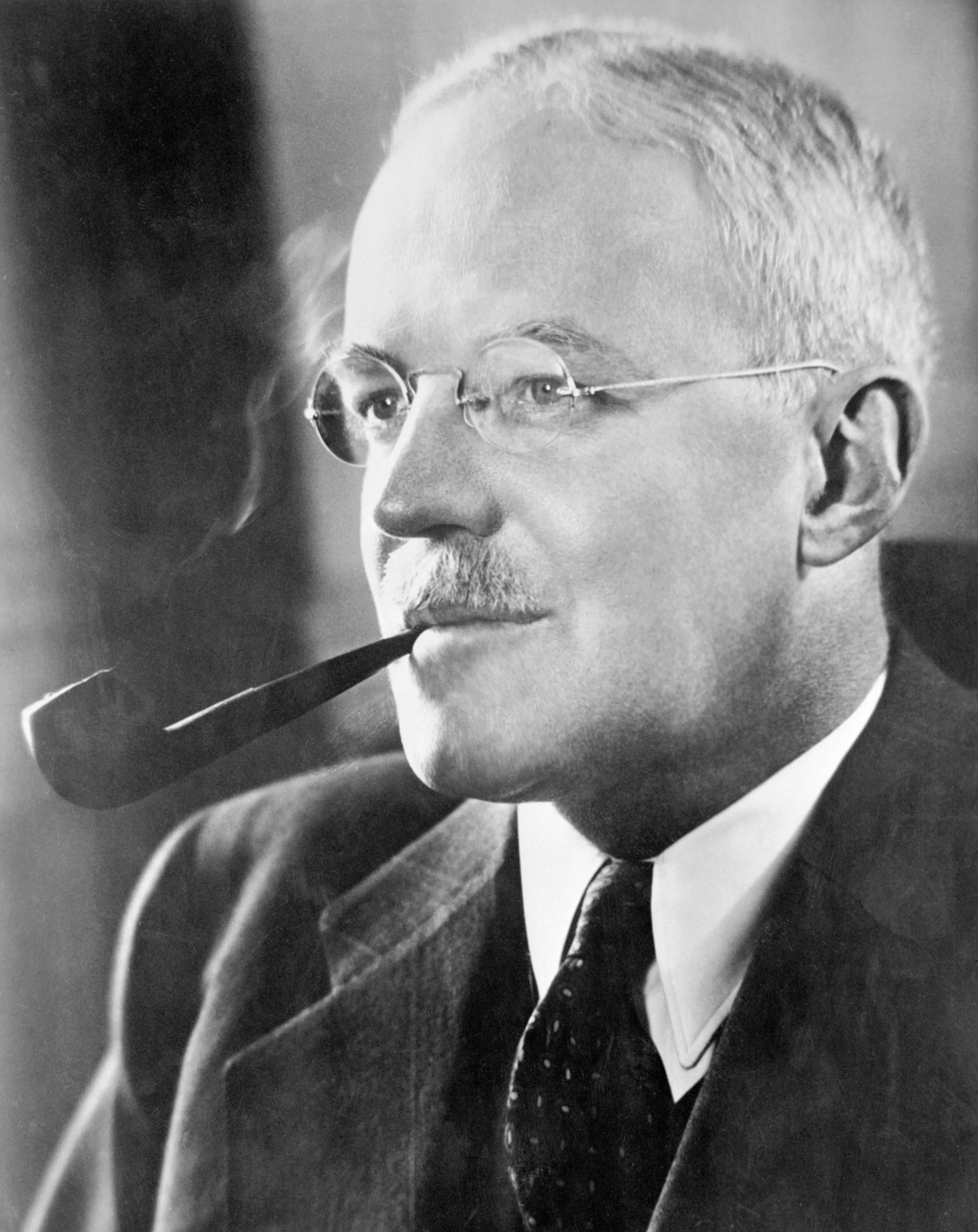
  Allen Dulles, son of a Presbyterian minister
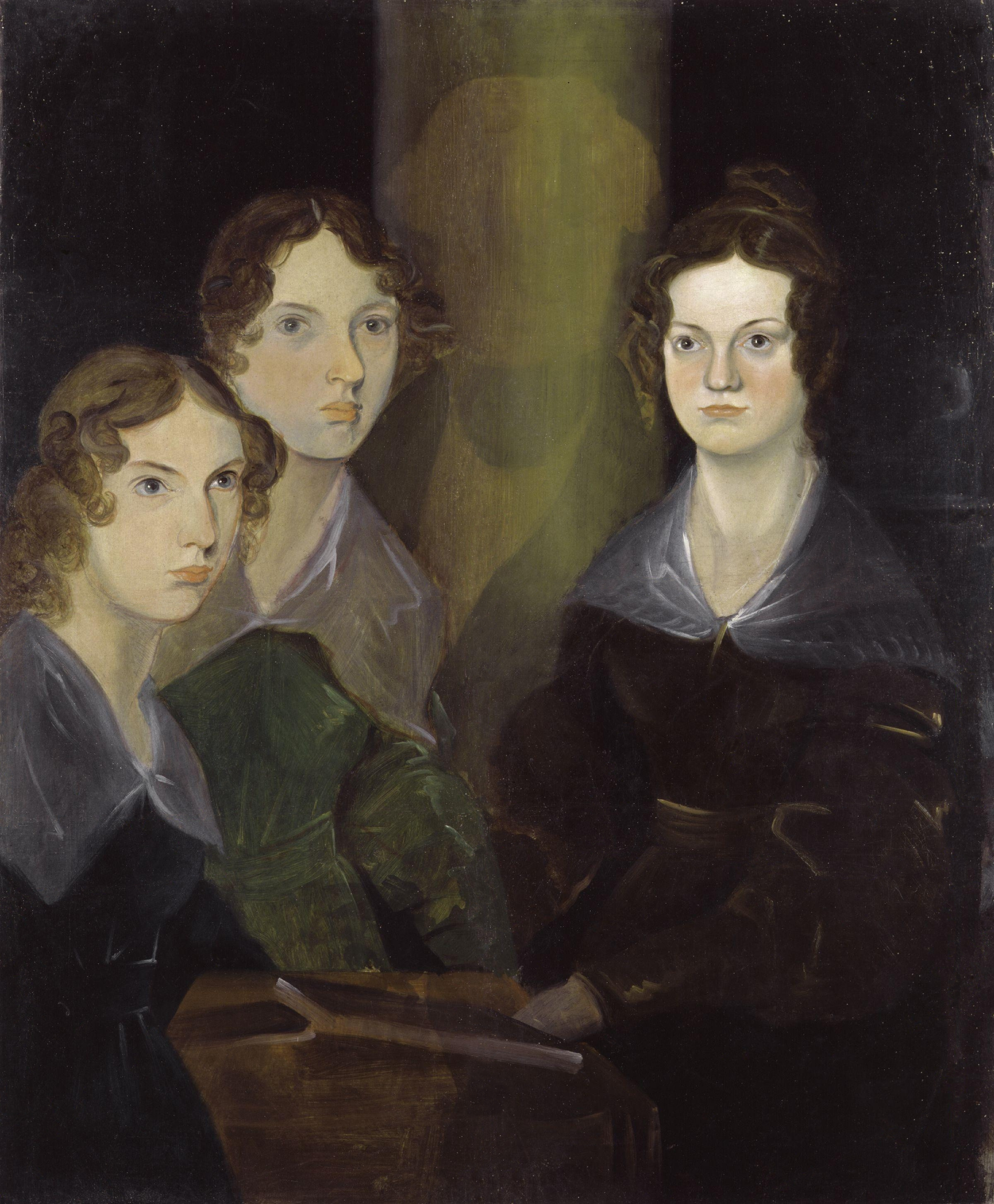
  Brontë sisters, daughters of a priest in the Church of England

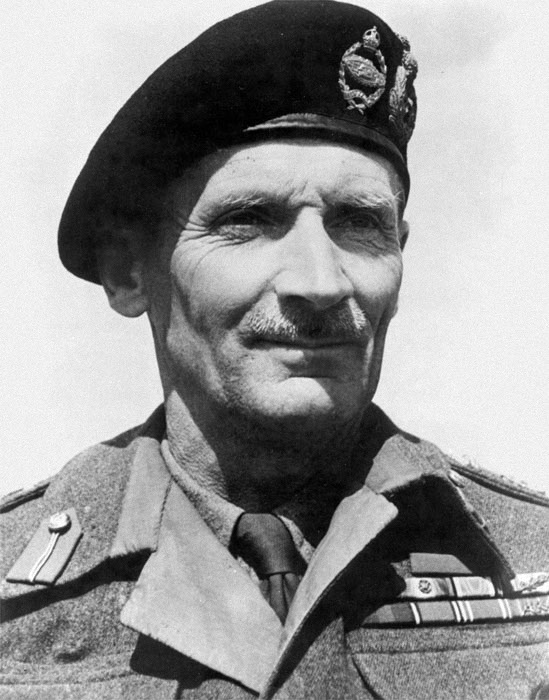
Bernard Montgomery, son of a Church of Ireland minister

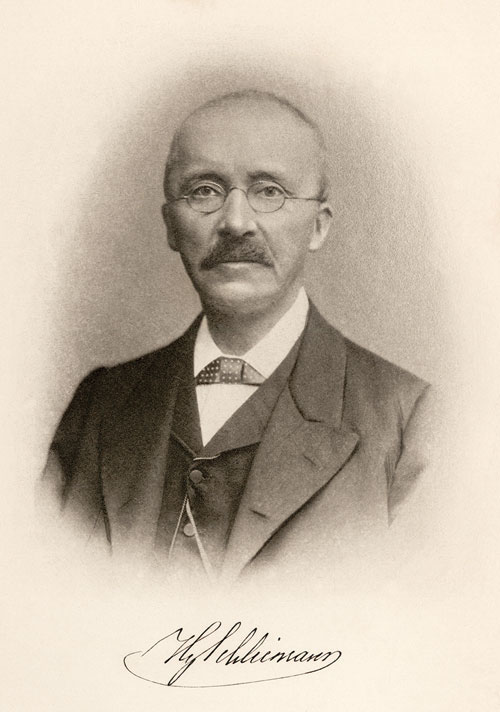
Heinrich Schliemann, son of a pastor

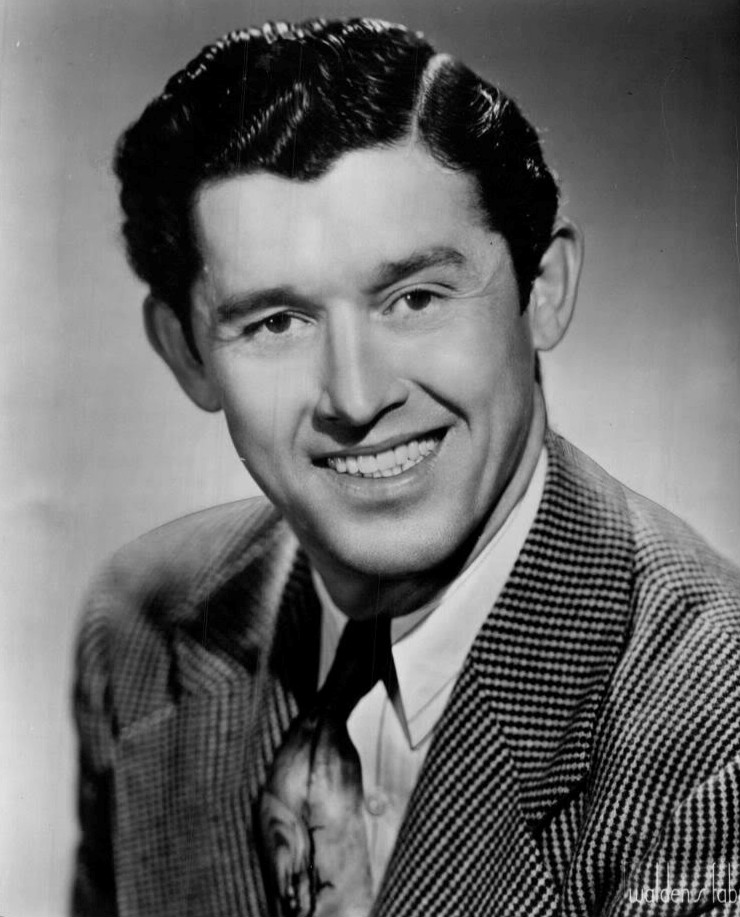
Roy Acuff, son of a Baptist preacher

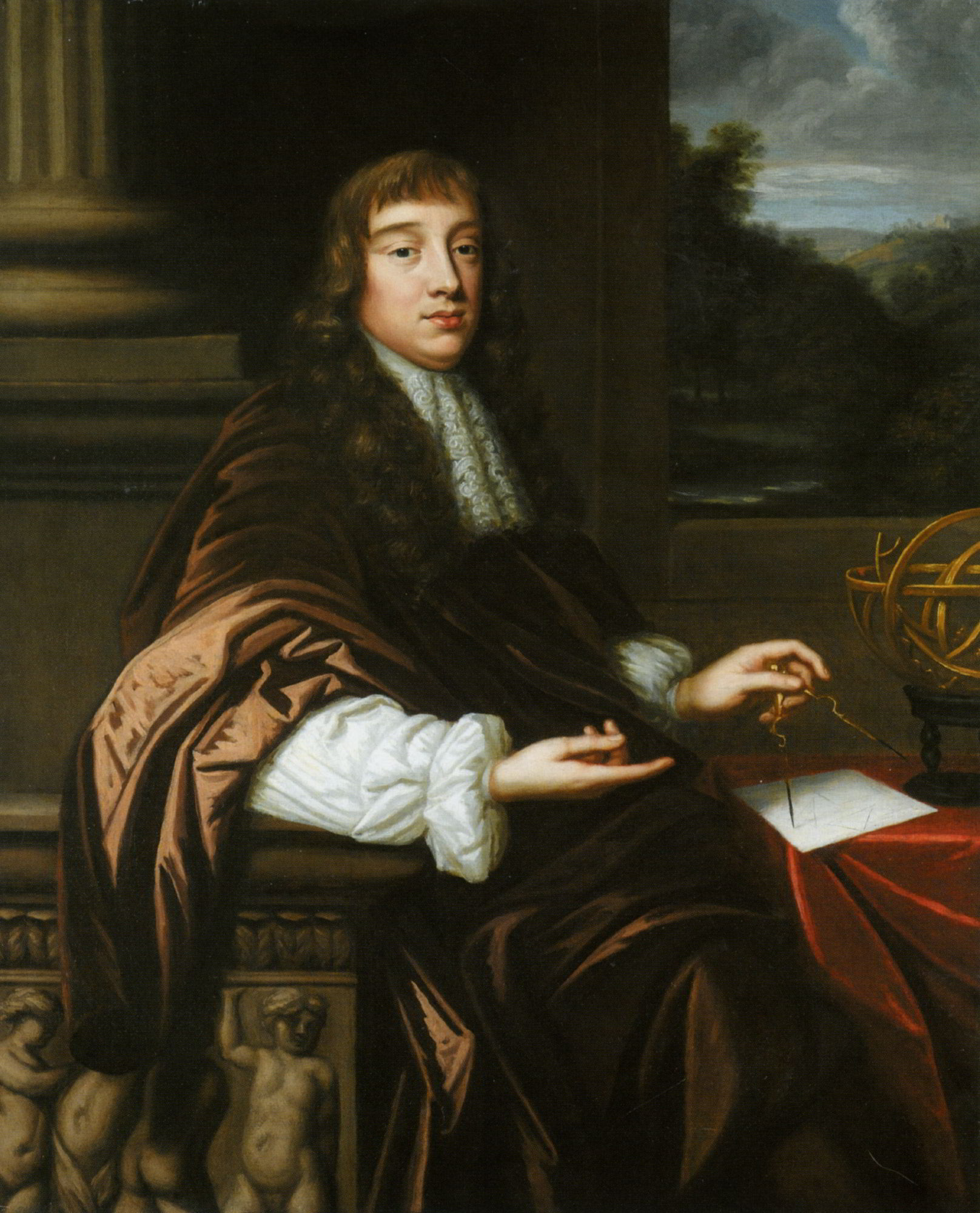
Robert Hooke, son of a curate of the Church of England

- Alex Briley – got his start singing in church.
- Anne Brontë, Charlotte Brontë, Emily Brontë – sister novelists, daughters of an Anglican vicar.
- Branwell Brontë – brother of the Brontë sisters.
- Cleanth Brooks – literary critic who wrote Community, Religion, and Literature: Essays (1995).
- Gordon Brown – former prime minister of Great Britain, son of a Church of Scotland minister.
- Measha Brueggergosman – Canadian soprano, opera singer and concert artist; her father is a Baptist pastor.
- Walter Brueggemann – influential Old Testament scholar and writer during the early 21st century. He often speaks of the influence of his father, a German Evangelical pastor. Published over 100 books.
- Pearl S. Buck – child of missionaries with her father being a minister.
- Aaron Burr – Vice President of the United States who studied theology at Princeton University and whose father was Reverend Aaron Burr Sr.
- John Buchan, 1st Baron Tweedsmuir – Scottish writer, served as Governor General of Canada, son of a Free Church of Scotland minister.
- Jamal Harrison Bryant – founder/Pastor of Empowerment Temple AME Church Baltimore MD, author of "World War Me: How to Win the War I Lost", is the son of Bishop John Richard Bryant of the African Methodist Episcopal Church.
- Jeremy Camp – contemporary Christian musician. His father is pastor at Harvest Chapel, a Calvary Chapel church in Lafayette, IN.
- Alexander Campbell – Church planter/minister in independent congregations in US during Restoration Movement.
- John McLeod Campbell – nineteenth-century Scottish minister and a Reformed theologian of note. He disagreed with the Westminster Confession of Faith's view of a limited atonement.
- Bart Campolo – First humanist chaplain at the University of Southern California; an American humanist speaker and writer he is the son of Tony Campolo.
- Lois Capps – attended Pacific Lutheran University and has a Master's in religion.
- Bampfylde Moore Carew – Self-proclaimed king of beggars.
- James Carr – Started his music career in church.
- Lewis Carroll – English writer, mathematician, logician, Anglican deacon and photographer was son of Charles Dodgson, Archdeacon of Richmond.
- Wilf Carter – widely acknowledged as the father of Canadian country music, was Canada's first country music star, inspiring a generation of young Canadian performers. Son of a Baptist minister.
- JJ Chalmers - TV presenter and Invictus Games medallist, son of John Chalmers, Moderator of the General Assembly of the Church of Scotland.
- Francis Pharcellus Church – author of the New York Sun article, "Yes, Virginia, There is a Santa Claus;" son of a Baptist minister
- Carl Henry Clerk – agricultural educator, journalist, editor and Presbyterian minister, son of the Basel missionary, Nicholas Timothy Clerk. His mother also had Carl Meyer, a Basel Mission pastor for a father.
- George C. Clerk – botanist and plant pathologist, son of Presbyterian minister, Carl Henry Clerk.
- Jane E. Clerk – teacher and pioneer woman education administrator on the Gold Coast, daughter of the Basel missionary, Nicholas Timothy Clerk. Her mother also had a Basel Mission pastor, Carl Meyer for a father.
- Matilda J. Clerk – physician and science educator, daughter of the Basel missionary, Nicholas Timothy Clerk. Her maternal grandfather, Carl Meyer, was also a Basel Mission pastor
- Nicholas T. Clerk – academic, public administrator and Presbyterian minister, son of Presbyterian minister, Carl Henry Clerk
- Nicholas Timothy Clerk – theologian, clergyman and missionary, son of Jamaican Moravian missionary, Alexander Worthy Clerk
- Theodore S. Clerk – architect and urban planner, son of the Basel missionary, Nicholas Timothy Clerk. His mother's father, Carl Meyer was also a Basel Mission pastor.
- Grover Cleveland – 22nd and 24th President of the United States. His father was a Presbyterian minister.
- Jim Clyburn – served as the third-ranking House Democrat, behind Nancy Pelosi and Steny Hoyer, from 2007 until 2023.
- Wayne K. Clymer – Methodist bishop.
- Nat King Cole – singer and jazz pianist, son of a Baptist minister.
- Sheila Schuller Coleman – American educator involved in the operation of Crystal Cathedral, founded by her father Robert H. Schuller.
- Ned Corbett – was an innovator with use of radio and a pioneer adult educator in Canada.
- Sam Cooke – gospel and rhythm & blues.
- Alice Cooper – born Vincent Furnier, singer/songwriter and Theatrical Rock Icon, son of a lay preacher in the Church of Jesus Christ
- William Lawson Cotton – Canadian newspaperman and pioneer in introduction of daily newspapers.
- Stephen Crane – author of The Red Badge of Courage, son of a Methodist minister.
- Adelaide Crapsey – daughter of Episcopalian priest Algernon Sidney Crapsey.
- Donald Grant Creighton – university teacher, noted historian, and author was the son of the Reverend William Black Creighton, a Methodist.
- Elijah Cummings – American politician and civil rights advocate.
- Rivers Cuomo – lead vocalist, guitarist, keyboardist, and songwriter of the rock band Weezer, was raised in a Zen Buddhist Center, which his father left to become a Pentecostal preacher.
- Robert Curl – emeritus professor of chemistry at Rice University. He was awarded the Nobel Prize in Chemistry in 1996. Curl was the son of a Methodist minister.
- Ted Cruz – American politician and attorney, son of Rafael Cruz.
- Hugh Dennis – his father, John Dennis, was the Bishop of Saint Edmundsbury and Ipswich.
- Dorothea Dix – social reformer, daughter of a circuit Methodist minister.
- James Dobson – American author, psychologist, and founder of Focus on the Family, has three generations of Church of the Nazarene ministers as his paternal ancestors.
- Kent Dobson – teaching pastor of Mars Hill Bible Church, an American megachurch is the son of Ed Dobson.
- Silas Dodu – Ghanaian physician and academic, son of Edward Maxwell Dodu, a Presbyterian Minister who served as the Moderator of the Presbyterian Church of Ghana from 1955 to 1958
- Florence Dolphyne – Ghanaian academic and linguist, first female professor in Ghana, daughter of a Methodist minister
- Isaak August Dorner – Lutheran churchleader and son of a Lutheran pastor.
- Adam Driver – Kylo Ren in the Star Wars sequel trilogy.
- John Foster Dulles – attended international religious conferences.
- Holly Dunn – "Daddy's Hands" is about her preacher father.
- Jonathan Edwards (the younger) – son of Jonathan Edwards.
- Jonathan Edwards (theologian) – son of Timothy Edwards (1668–1759), a minister at East Windsor, Connecticut.
- Monica Edwards – author whose "Tamzin Grey" character is also a vicar's daughter.
- Tom Ellis - Welsh actor, he is known for playing Lucifer Morningstar. His father, uncle, and one of his sisters are all Baptist ministers.
- Leonard K. Elmhirst – once intended to follow his father into the Church.
- Ralph Waldo Emerson – American essayist, lecturer, and poet, who led the Transcendentalist movement of the mid-19th century, was the son of a Unitarian minister.
- Gudrun Ensslin – her father was a pastor in the Evangelical Church in Germany, she became a founder of the Baader-Meinhof Group.
- Jean Erdman – American dancer and choreographer of modern dance. In 1990, she became the founding president of the Joseph Campbell Foundation, dedicated to the work of her late husband Joseph Campbell.
- Johann August Ernesti – theologian
- Ebenezer Erskine – celebrated divine, and founder of the secession church in Scotland, and his brother a fellow Presbyterian clergyman Ralph Erskine were both sons of the Rev. Henry Erskine.
- Leonhard Euler – mathematician and strongly religious. His mother also had a pastor for a father.
- Sir Robert Falconer – Canadian academic and 5th President of the University of Toronto.
- Gustav Fechner – experimental psychologist who wrote on religion or metaphysics.
- Reginald Fessenden – Canadian-born inventor is best known for his pioneering work developing radio technology.
- Nathan Field – British playwright and actor.
- Mark Few – head basketball coach at Gonzaga University; married by his father.
- Antony Flew – noted atheist philosopher and scholar turned deist, son of Robert Newton Flew.
- Robert Newton Flew – English Methodist minister and theologian, and an advocate of ecumenism.
- Caleb Followill, Jared Followill and Nathan Followill – brothers and members of the band Kings of Leon. Sons of Ivan Leon Followill, a Pentecostal evangelist minister, who traveled around the American South.
- Aretha Franklin – "The Queen of Soul" and daughter of a Baptist minister.
- Peter Fraser, Baron Fraser of Carmyllie - Scottish lawyer and MP, son of a Church of Scotland missionary in Zambia.
- James Oliphant Fraser – businessman and political figure in Newfoundland, one of ten sons and a daughter born to the first Presbyterian minister on the island.
- Andrew Henderson Leith Fraser, British officer in colonial India, son of a Protestant minister, Alexander Garden Fraser (1814–1904).
- Rob Frazier – contemporary Christian music artist.
- Seth Gaaikema – Dutch comedian.
- Israel Gaither – father was a Baptist preacher, he is currently the first African American to lead the Salvation Army
- Elizabeth Gaskell – writer, father was a Unitarian minister.
- Marvin Gaye – his father and killer was minister Marvin Pentz Gay Sr. "God is Love", from the album What's Going On, directly relates to Christianity.
- Franklin Graham and Anne Graham Lotz – evangelists and authors and children of American evangelist Billy Graham.
- Alfred Perceval Graves – son of the bishop of Limerick who did A Celtic Psaltery.
- Sir Wilfred Grenfell – medical missionary in coastal area of Newfoundland and Labrador.
- Kimberly Hahn – convert to Catholicism.
- Arsenio Hall – son of Baptist minister.
- Camilla Hall – early member of the Symbionese Liberation Army killed in a shootout with police.
- John Hancock – American Revolutionary leader, was son of Rev. Col. John Hancock Jr. and grandson of John Hancock Sr., who were both clergymen.
- W. C. Handy –his father and grandfather were pastors or ministers and it had an effect on his music.
- Neil Hannon – son of Brian Hannon, a Church of Ireland clergyman who was Bishop of Clogher from 1986 to 2001.
- Ryan Hansen – says Christian Youth Theater is an important part of his life as is being a pastor's son.
- Nolan Bailey Harmon – Methodist bishop.
- Charles Hartshorne – philosopher of religion.
- Thomas Hastings – American architect, son of a Presbyterian minister
- Hampton Hawes – jazz musician.
- Bob Hawke – Australian Prime Minister, son of a Congregationalist minister
- Lee Hays – American folk-singer and songwriter, with The Weavers. Son of William Hays, a Methodist minister, he was concerned with overcoming racism, inequality, and violence in society.
- Anne Heche – American actress. Father was a Baptist minister and church organist.
- Chris Hedges – Pulitzer Prize–winning journalist with a Master of Divinity from Harvard Divinity School. He wrote American Fascists: The Christian Right and the War on America. Father was a Presbyterian minister and anti-war activist.
- Matthew Henry – author of commentaries on the Old and New Testaments
- Archibald Alexander Hodge – Presbyterian theologian and son of Charles Hodge
- Robert Hooke － Natural philosopher
- Isabella Beecher Hooker – daughter of Lyman Beecher who became associated to Victoria Woodhull's movement.
- Joel Houston – son of Brian Houston, Pastor of Hillsong Church. Well known CCM singer and songwriter in the band Hillsong United
- Tim Hughes – Christian music artist.
- Anne Hutchinson – born Anne Marbury (1591–1643), Puritan spiritual adviser, mother of 15, and an important participant in the Free Grace Controversy that shook the infant Massachusetts Bay Colony from 1636 to 1638.
- Bill Hwang - Co-founder of the Grace and Mercy Foundation, a charitable organization with more than US$500 million (2018) in assets. An investor, Hwang lost US$20 billion over the course of ten days in late March 2021.
- William Arthur Irwin – distinguished Canadian journalist and diplomat, known as the man who made Maclean's, truly "Canada's National Magazine."
- S. Clifton Ives – bishop, son of a pastor.
- Daniel Ernst Jablonski – son of a Moravian Church minister who tried to unite Lutherans and Calvinists.
- Brandon T. Jackson – American stand-up comedian, actor, and comedian. Both parents are ministers.
- Jesse Jackson Jr.
- Phil Jackson – former NBA player and coach; both parents were Assemblies of God ministers. His older brother Chuck speculated years later that Phil threw himself passionately into sports because it was the only time that their very strict parents allowed Phil and his brothers to do what other children were doing.
- Julian Jaynes – American psychologist, best known for his book The Origin of Consciousness in the Breakdown of the Bicameral Mind (1976), in which he developed the idea of auditory hallucinations as one of the earliest forms of religious experience.
- Wyclef Jean – Haitian-born rapper, musician and actor, who remains active in Haitian issues. Son of a Nazarene pastor.
- Kevin Jennings – American educator, author, and administrator who started the nations' first gay-straight alliance together with a female student and published six books on gay rights and education.
- Leonard Jenyns – British parson-naturalist was a son of George Leonard Jenyns.
- Jonas Brothers – pop-rock boy band members, sons of a former Assembly of God minister.
- Freek de Jonge – Dutch comedian
- Bob Jones Jr.
- Carl Jung – psychiatrist, influential thinker and founder of analytical psychology was the son of pastor in the Swiss Reformed Church.
- k-os – Canadian rapper, singer, songwriter and record producer. His father was a minister at two congregations in the Greater Toronto Area.
- Kenneth Kaunda – first President of Zambia.
- Kelis – American musical artist. Father is a Pentecostal minister.
- Leontine T. C. Kelly – retired Methodist bishop who won a Thomas Merton Award and was inducted into the National Women's Hall of Fame. Daughter, sister, widow, mother, and mother-in-law of Methodist ministers.
- Sam Kinison – comedian/Actor (musician?), son of a Pentecostal Preacher
- Bernice King
- Dexter Scott King
- Martin Luther King Jr.
- Martin Luther King III
- Yolanda King
- Charles Kingsley – Author and clergyman, son of another priest called Charles Kingsley
- Ronald Knox – Author, son of Bishop of Manchester
- Kyle Korver – American NBA player; father a Reformed Church pastor.
- Walter Russell Lambuth – missionary and child of missionaries.
- Archibald Lampman – considered the finest of Canada's late 19th-century poets in English.
- Lemmy – English rock musician and founder of the band Motörhead. His father was a Royal Air Force chaplain.
- Julius Lester – convert to Judaism.
- Row Lewis – activist, daughter of a Pentecostal Pastor.
- Eric Liddell – athlete and missionary.
- Henry Liddell – British scholar and reverend.
- Paper Lions Canadian indie rock band includes brothers John and Rob MacPhee, sons of Rev. Roger MacPhee, a Presbyterian minister.
- John D. MacArthur – American businessman and philanthropist, son of a Baptist preacher.
- Clarence Mackinnon – Canadian minister and academic who embraced Darwinism and played key role in the formation of the United Church of Canada in 1925.
- Norman Maclean – American academic and author of A River Runs Through It.
- Preston Manning – Canadian Reform politician, son of Ernest Manning who was premier of Alberta and concurrent with his political career was an evangelist on radio with "Back to the Bible Hour."
- John Ross Matheson – Canadian lawyer, judge, and politician who played key role in establishing national symbols like the Canadian flag and the Order of Canada.
- Charlie Manuel – former manager of the Philadelphia Phillies of Major League Baseball. Son of a Pentecostal preacher who committed suicide just before Charlie graduated from high school, which led him to abandon a possible basketball career in favor of professional baseball.
- Roots Manuva – British rapper.
- Andrew Marvell – poet, wrote poems on metaphysical or spiritual subjects.
- Cotton Mather – American Puritan minister.
- Theresa May – British Prime Minister, daughter of Anglican priest.
- Sheena McDonald - Scottish journalist, her father was a Church of Scotland minister.
- Rolf McPherson – his mother was Aimee Semple McPherson.
- George McGovern – American historian and Democratic Party nominee in the 1972 presidential election.
- Angela Merkel – Chancellor of Germany, chairwoman of the Christian Democratic Union (Germany), and a Lutheran pastor's daughter.
- W. S. Merwin – American poet, credited with over fifty books. Merwin's writing influence derived from his interest in Buddhist philosophy and deep ecology. Son of a Presbyterian minister.
- Kelly Minter – Christian singer-songwriter and author.
- Charles Bayard Mitchell – Methodist Bishop
- Leona Mitchell – American operatic soprano is the daughter of Rev. Dr. Hulon Mitchell.
- Ernest John Moeran – English composer, some church music.
- Theodor Mommsen – German classical scholar, historian, jurist, journalist, politician, archaeologist, Nobel Prize laureate in Literature
- Walter Mondale – Vice President of the United States from 1977 to 1981.
- Adolphe Monod – pastor himself.
- Théodore Monod – French naturalist, explorer, and humanist scholar.
- Bernard Montgomery - British Field Marshal, son of an Anglican bishop.
- Steve Morse – American guitarist, best known as the founder of the Dixie Dregs, and guitarist for Deep Purple since 1994.
- Marcus Mumford – American-born singer, songwriter, and producer best known as the lead singer of the British folk band Mumford & Sons. Parents until 2015 were leaders within the Vineyard Movement in the U.K.
- Reinhold Neibuhr and H. Richard Niebuhr – Neo-orthodox American Protestant theologians. Sons of a minister in the Evangelical Synod of North America, now the United Church of Christ.
- Horatio Nelson – British admiral, son of Norfolk vicar
- Friedrich Nietzsche – Noted critic of Christianity who wrote The Antichrist (book).
- Smokie Norful – minister and gospel singer.
- Robert Noyce – co-founded Fairchild Semiconductor in 1957 and Intel Corporation in 1968.
- John Louis Nuelsen – Methodist bishop.
- Laurence Olivier - actor, son of an Anglican priest.
- Joel Osteen – American author, and televangelist who reaches 7 million viewers weekly is son of televangelist John Osteen.
- Gregory Vaughn Palmer – United Methodist bishop.
- Katherine Paterson – children's author, writer of Bridge to Terabithia
- Paige Patterson – conservative Southern Baptist reformer.
- Sandi Patty – contemporary Christian music artist. Her father was a minister of music.
- Aaron Paul – actor, son of a Baptist minister.
- Donny Pauling – American former porn producer, now a Christian speaking publicly about what goes on behind the scenes. His father was a Pentecostal Church of God minister and currently a pastor of the Assembly of God church.
- Lester B. Pearson – Canadian Prime Minister, received the Nobel Peace Prize in 1957. He is considered the father of the modern concept of peacekeeping.
- Jaroslav Pelikan – Lutheran religious historian who converted to Russian Orthodoxy later in life.
- Katy Perry – American pop singer-songwriter, daughter of two pastors.
- Nathan Phelps – Canadian author, speaker on religion and child abuse, and an LGBT advocate is the son of anti-gay American pastor Fred Phelps, who gained infamy though his picketing of military funerals and gay pride gatherings.
- Helen Phillips – most known for opera, but also did interpretations of "Negro spirituals."
- Matthew Pinsent - Olympic rower, son of an Anglican priest.
- John Piper – American Reformed Baptist preacher and author of 54 books. He coined the term Christian hedonism in his 1986 book Desiring God.
- Chonda Pierce – American entertainer and founder of Preacher's Kids International.
- The Pointer Sisters – daughters of Church of God minister.
- Clark V. Poling – Reformed Church minister of the Four Chaplains, His father was an Evangelical turned Baptist minister.
- Henrik Pontoppidan – a Danish realist writer and Nobel Prize Laureate in 1917 and his brother Knud Pontoppidan a Danish psychiatrist and doctor were sons of a vicar and belonged to an old family of vicars and writers that had included the famous pietistic priest Erik Pontoppidan.
- Henry Codman Potter – bishop and son of a bishop.
- Asafa Powell – track-and-field sprinter. Both his parents are pastors and he plays for a church band.
- Adam Clayton Powell Jr. – pastor and politician.
- E. J. Pratt – "The leading Canadian poet of his time." The son of a Methodist minister who himself studied for the Ministry before pursuing an academic career.
- Titus Awotwi Pratt – Ghanaian educator and Methodist minister, son of Methodist minister, Charles Awotwi Pratt
- Katharine Purvis – she wrote "When the saints are Marching in", originally a Christian hymn.
- Emmanuel Charles Quist – barrister and judge, son of Basel Mission pastor, Carl Quist
- Bernice Johnson Reagon – founder of Sweet Honey in the Rock.
- Onésime Reclus – French geographer. Father minister in the French Reformed Church.
- Elisée Reclus – French geographer, writer and anarchist. Father minister in the French Reformed Church
- Erik Reece – American writer, the author of two books of nonfiction and writer-in-residence at the University of Kentucky in Lexington, where he teaches environmental journalism, writing, and literature. Son and grandson of a Baptist minister.
- John Reith, 1st Baron Reith - Director General of the BBC, son of a Church of Scotland minister
- Cecil Rhodes – British born, was prominent in 19th century South African and Rhodesian politics.
- Condoleezza Rice – United States' 66th Secretary of State, daughter of a Presbyterian minister.
- Matthew Henry Richey – Canadian politician, was son of Methodist minister Matthew Richey.
- Bernhard Riemann – mathematician whose father was a Lutheran pastor, Bernhard also studied theology.
- Clement Daniel Rockey – Methodist bishop.
- Sir Charles G. D. Roberts – Canadian poet and prose writer who is known as the Father of Canadian Poetry.
- Olaus Rudbeck – son of bishop Johannes Rudbeckius.
- John Scott Russell – Scottish civil engineer, naval architect and shipbuilder who built the Great Eastern his research gave birth to the modern study of solitons.
- James Runcie – son of Robert Runcie who was Archbishop of Canterbury. British author, whose book series The Grantchester Mysteries became adapted for TV as Grantchester with a leading figure of an Anglican clergyman turned amateur detective.
- Sarah Huckabee Sanders – Governor of Arkansas since 2023
- John A. Sanford – American Jungian analyst, writer and Episcopal priest. His father, grandfather, and two great-grandfathers were all Episcopal priests.
- Dorothy L. Sayers – British crime novelist, playwright, translator and Christian apologist, daughter of Anglican priest
- Frank Schaeffer – American author, film director, screenwriter and public speaker. Son of the late theologian, minister and author Francis Schaeffer.
- Gustav Adolf Scheel – member of Nazi Germany's Schutzstaffel who studied theology.
- Heinrich Schliemann – his minister father was an early influence on his becoming an archaeologist.
- Robert A. Schuller – American televangelist, and author – son of Crystal Cathedral founder Robert H. Schuller.
- Albert Schweitzer – Nobel peace prize in 1952, French theologian, organist, philosopher, physician, and medical missionary. Father was a Lutheran minister.
- Alexander John Scott – Scottish dissident theologian, who became the first principal of Owens College.
- Duncan Campbell Scott – Canadian poet, prose writer and prominent civil servant.
- F. R. Scott – Canadian poet, intellectual and constitutional expert. Son of an Anglican priest, he helped found the first Canadian social democratic party.
- George Gilbert Scott – architect whose designs include churches.
- Rhoda Scott – jazz musician who became interested in music at her father's church.
- Elias Simojoki – Finnish Fascist clergyman.
- Nina Simone – her mother was a Methodist minister and as a girl she played at her church.
- Ashlee Simpson – father was a Baptist minister.
- Jessica Simpson – father was a Baptist minister.
- Huston Smith – American author and religious studies scholar; he was born to missionaries in China.
- Jon Snow - journalist and broadcaster, son of an Anglican bishop.
- Johann Wilhelm Ernst Sommer – bishop.
- R. C. Sproul Jr. – son of Presbyterian theologian R. C. Sproul
- David Steel - son of Church of Scotland Minister and Moderator of the General Assembly, David Steel.
- Darcey Steinke – American novelist and essayist and daughter of a Lutheran minister and direct descendant on her mother's side of William Miller, a 19th-century preacher credited as the founder of the Millerites, the forerunner of the Seventh-day Adventists.
- Paul Steinitz – served as a church organist and as a conductor performed St.Matthew Passion.
- Jerome A. Stone – helped develop the religious movement of Religious Naturalism
- Harriet Beecher Stowe – daughter of Lyman Beecher, and wife of a minister, she wrote Uncle Tom's Cabin. Like their father the family became leaders in social change. Her 12 siblings included Henry Ward Beecher, Charles Beecher, Edward Beecher, Isabella Beecher Hooker, Catharine Beecher and Thomas K. Beecher.
- Ted Strehlow – anthropologist son of pastor/missionary Carl Strehlow.
- John Sulston – British biologist. he was awarded Nobel Prize in Physiology or Medicine in 2002. He was son of an Anglican priest and administrator of the Society for the Propagation of the Gospel.
- Emanuel Swedenborg – father was Jesper Swedberg, priest who became the bishop of Skara.
- Prince Albert Taylor Jr – Bishop.
- Ryan Tedder – American singer, songwriter and record producer. He is best known as the lead vocalist for pop rock band OneRepublic.
- William Temple (archbishop) – Archbishop of Canterbury and son of a previous Archbishop of Canterbury.
- David Tennant – Son of Reverend Alexander "Sandy" McDonald, a Church of Scotland minister and Moderator of the General Assembly.
- Alfred, Lord Tennyson – English poet laureate, son of Anglican rector.
- Sister Rosetta Tharpe – Gospel singer whose mother was an evangelist.
- Margaret Thatcher – first woman Prime Minister of the United Kingdom; her father, Alfred Roberts was a local Methodist lay preacher.
- David Thomas – Canadian comedian and actor, son of John E. Thomas, a pastor and later a professor of philosophy.
- Ian Thomas – Canadian singer, songwriter, actor and author and younger brother to famed comedian and actor Dave Thomas.
- Norman Thomas – Socialist, ordained in Presbyterianism as had his father.
- Dorothy Thompson – American journalist and radio broadcaster, in 1939 recognized by Time magazine as the second most influential woman in America next to Eleanor Roosevelt.
- Paul Tillich – German-American theologian and Christian existentialist philosopher.
- Matthew Tindal – English deist. (Christian deism)
- Tye Tribbett – American gospel music singer, songwriter, keyboardist, choir director.
- Sir Charles Tupper – A Canadian father of Confederation, premier of Nova Scotia and prime minister of Canada.
- James Tytler – Scottish apothecary and the editor of the second edition of Encyclopædia Britannica. Tytler became the first person in Britain to steer a hot air balloon.
- Vincent van Gogh – Missionary himself before becoming an artist. A pioneer of what came to be known as Expressionism.
- Jim Wacker – Son of a Lutheran minister who coached at Texas Lutheran University.
- Virginia Wade – tennis player, daughter of an Anglican priest.
- Michael Redd – basketball player
- Deontay Wilder – Holding the World Boxing Council (WBC) heavyweight title from 2015 to 2020.
- Morgan Wallen - Son of a Tennessee Preacher.
- Ernest Walton – Irish physicist and Nobel laureate in Physics.
- C. F. W. Walther – First President of the Lutheran Church–Missouri Synod.
- Rick Warren – Evangelical pastor and best-selling author, son of a Baptist minister.
- Denzel Washington – actor, son of a Pentecostal preacher.
- Alfred Wegener － Originator of Continental drift theory
- John Wesley, Charles Wesley – Founders of Methodism and Anglican priests were sons of Samuel Wesley, an Anglican priest.
- Cornel West – American philosopher, academic, activist, author, public intellectual, and prominent member of the Democratic Socialists of America. He was the first African American to graduate from Princeton with a Ph.D. in philosophy.
- Tim Westwood – English DJ and presenter of radio and television, son of Bill Westwood, former Bishop of Peterborough.
- Wilhelm Martin Leberecht de Wette – theologian and exegete.
- Portia White – one of the great contraltos in the history of Canadian music was a daughter of Izie Dora and Rev. William Andrew White.
- Alfred North Whitehead – English mathematician and philosopher; his Philosophy of Organism gave rise to process theology in which God, as source of the universe, is viewed as growing and changing.
- J. H. C. Whitehead – British mathematician and one of the founders of homotopy theory.
- Edmund Russell Willson – American architect. His father was a minister.
- Woodrow Wilson – 28th President of the United States. His father was a Presbyterian minister.
- Ralph Vaughan Williams – Composer, son of Anglican clergyman.
- Joy Williams – American singer-songwriter.
- Sir Christopher Wren – one of the greatest English architects of his time. Wren designed 53 London churches, including St Paul's Cathedral.
- Lizz Wright – contemporary jazz/R&B musician who describes herself as having a gospel music influence.
- Wright brothers – sons of Milton Wright (Bishop).
- Malcolm X – convert to Islam whose father is described as "an outspoken Baptist minister."
- Yahweh ben Yahweh – imprisoned founder of the Nation of Yahweh.
- William P. Young – author of best-selling novel The Shack, child of Canadian missionaries who worked in Dutch New Guinea.

=== Islam (children of Imams, Shaykhs, or Ayatollahs) ===
- Abdul-Majid al-Khoei
- Shareef Abdur-Rahim – basketball player and son of an imam.
- Amadu II of Masina – political leader and son of an Imam.
- Ahmadu Tall – son of El Hadj Umar Tall.

=== Jewish ===
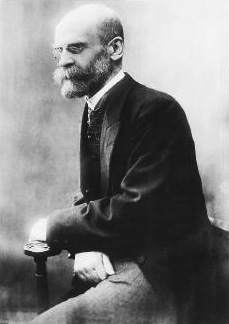
Émile Durkheim, Son of a rabbi

- Lionel Abel and Raziel Abelson, both sons of Rabbi Alter Abelson.
- Felix Adler (professor), son of rabbi Samuel Adler
- Yaacov Agam – Israeli sculptor.
- Boris Aronson
- Leo Baeck – German rabbi, scholar, and theologian
- Devorah Baron – writer.
- Samuel ben Meïr (RaSHBaM), Isaac ben Meïr (RIVaM), and Jacob ben Meïr (Rabbeinu Tam), all sons of rabbi Meir ben Samuel.
- Irving Berlin – Composer and lyricist, considered one of the greatest songwriters in American history was the son of a Jewish cantor.
- Michael Chertoff
- Robert Debré – French pediatrician.
- Mickey Duff – Polish-born British boxer.
- Émile Durkheim – agnostic sociologist and philosopher who descended from a long line of rabbis.
- Abram M. Edelman – American architect.
- Michael Fabricant
- Leon Felhendler – Polish resistance fighter.
- Moshe Feinstein – noted rabbi himself.
- Michal Friedlander and Noam Friedlander, children of Rabbi Albert Friedlander
- Israel Gollancz – scholar of early English literature and of Shakespeare.
- Alexander D. Goode – rabbi of the Four Chaplains, his father was also a rabbi.
- Samuel Gordon (novelist).
- Chaim Herzog – sixth President of Israel: his father was Yitzhak HaLevi Herzog.
- Susannah Heschel – American scholar, public intellectual, and professor of Jewish Studies at Dartmouth College – the daughter of Abraham Joshua Heschel.
- Harry Houdini
- Emil Jellinek – German engineer, son of rabbi Adolf Jellinek
- Al Jolson – American musician actor.
- Meir Kahane – rabbi and politician.
- Mordecai Kaplan - American rabbi.
- Victor Klemperer
- Sarah Kofman – French philosopher, daughter of Rabbi Bereck Kofman.
- Manoah Leide-Tedesco – Italian-American composer, conductor and violinist.
- Edward H. Levi – United States Attorney General under the Ford administration.
- Jay Lovestone – American activist.
- Judith Malina
- Paul Marciano – French-American fashion designer
- Adele Marcus - American pianist
- Atara Marmor – French historian, daughter of David Feuerwerker
- Jackie Mason - American comedian
- Marc-Alain Ouaknin - French rabbi and philosopher.
- Justine W. Polier, first woman Justice in the state of New York.
- Michael O. Rabin – an Israeli computer scientist and a recipient of the Turing Award, He was son of a rabbi.
- Paul Reuter – German entrepreneur, founder of Reuters.
- Bernard Revel – American rabbi and scholar.
- Ernestine Rose – American suffragist and abolitionist.
- David Rosen – Served as Chief Rabbi of Ireland (1979–85) and serves as the director of the American Jewish Committee's Department of Interreligious Affairs. A son of Rabbi Dr. Kopul Rosen, as are his brothers Jeremy Rosen and Michael Rosen.
- Maurice Rose – American general.
- Moses Rosen – Romanian rabbi.
- Barney Ross – American boxer.
- Erich Segal – American author, screenwriter, and educator.
- Israel Joshua Singer - novelist
- Joseph Spiegel – entrepreneur, founder of the Spiegel catalog
- Haim-Moshe Shapira - Israeli politician.
- Jonathan Silverman - American actor.
- Haym Solomon – Polish-born American Jewish businessman and political financial broker.
- Haym Soloveitchik - American rabbi and historian, son of rabbi Joseph B. Soloveitchik, himself son of rabbi Moshe Soloveichik, himself son of rabbi Chaim Soloveitchik, himself son of rabbi Yosef Dov Soloveitchik
- Manès Sperber – Austrian-French novelist, essayist and psychologist.
- David Steinberg - Canadian comedian and actor.
- Jacob Taubes, sociologist of religion, philosopher, and scholar of Judaism.
- Joel Teitelbaum - Romanian-born rabbi, son of rabbi Chananya Yom Tov Lipa Teitelbaum, himself son of rabbi Yekusiel Yehuda Teitelbaum, himself son of rabbi Elazar Nison Teitelbaum, himself son of rabbi Moshe Teitelbaum.
- Mike Todd – American theater and film producer.
- Judah Touro – American businessman and philanthropist.
- Reva Unterman – British columnist and author.
- Leo Wise – newspaper editor and publisher.
- Léon Zadoc-Kahn – French physicist, son of rabbi Zadoc Kahn.
- Efraim Zuroff - historian and nazi-hunter.

== Eastern religion ==
=== Buddhism ===
- Fumio Niwa – Japanese novelist.
- Kiyoura Keigo – Japanese politician.

=== Shinto ===
- Akira Ifukube – Japanese classical composer, son of a Shinto priest.
- Kamo no Mabuchi – Japanese poet.
- Setzuso Kotsuji – son of a prominent Shinto priest, descended from a long-line of well-known priests, converted to Orthodox Judaism

== See also ==
- Preacher's kid
