= Western Valley =

Civil parish in Oxfordshire, England

Coordinates: 51.61°N 1.28°W

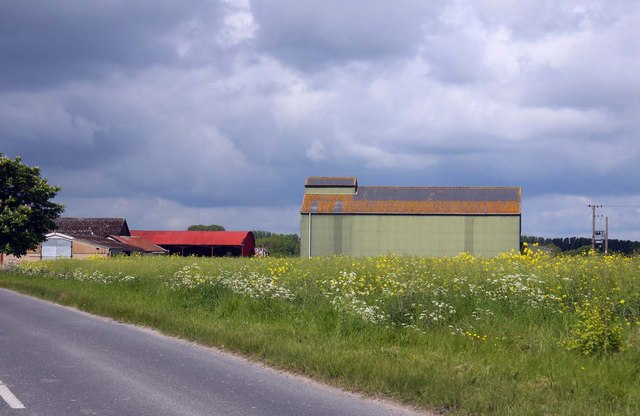
- Zulu Farm

- Location within Oxfordshire
- Civil parish: Western Valley
- District: Vale of White Horse
- Shire county: Oxfordshire
- Region: South East
- Country: England
- Sovereign state: United Kingdom
- Post town: Didcot
- Postcode district: OX11
- Dialling code: 01235
- UK Parliament: Didcot and Wantage

Western Valley is a civil parish in the eastern part of the Vale of White Horse district of Oxfordshire, England, to the east of Harwell and the west of Didcot. Historically it was part of Berkshire until the 1974 boundary changes transferred it to Oxfordshire. It consists of the western part of the Great Western Park housing estate on the edge of Didcot, and also includes the Valley Park development. The parish was created in April 2023 by splitting the Harwell civil parish where it was crossed by the A34 road, which runs along most of the western boundary of Western Valley, and the Great Western Main Line runs along the northern boundary. It is bordered by the civil parishes of Harwell, Milton and Sutton Courtenay in Vale of White Horse; and by: Didcot and West Hagbourne, both being in South Oxfordshire. The parish lies wholly within the Blewbury & Harwell ward of Vale of White Horse District Council, the Hendreds & Harwell Division of Oxfordshire County Council, and the Didcot and Wantage parliamentary constituency.

Elections to the eight seats on the new parish council were to be held on 4 May 2023, but only one valid nomination was received by the returning officer. Nominations were reopened, and a further four candidates were elected unopposed on 14 June 2023.

The parish contains two secondary schools: Aureus School and UTC Oxfordshire. These are on the western edge of the only substantial settlement, the Great Western Park housing estate, part of which is within Didcot. In the centre of this, and also partially within Didcot, is a large open space known as Boundary Park.
