= Elderfield =

Elderfield is a surname. Notable people with the surname include:

- Christopher Elderfield (1607–1652), English clergyman and theologian
- Henry Elderfield (1943–2016), British geologist
- John Elderfield (born 1943), American art historian and curator
- Matthew Elderfield (born 1966), British financial regulator
- Robert Elderfield (1904–1979), American chemist
