= St Birinus School =

Location
- Mereland Road; Didcot, Oxfordshire, OX11 8AZ; England; 51°36′05″N 1°14′31″W

Information
- Type: Academy
- Motto: Inspiring Excellence
- Established: 1936 as Didcot Boys County Modern, 2012 as an academy
- Local authority: Oxfordshire
- Department for Education URN: 138762 Tables
- Ofsted: Reports
- Headteacher: William Manning
- Staff: 79 (teaching excl. TAs)(2012)
- Gender: Boys
- Age: 11 to 16
- Enrolment: 1086 (2014)
- Capacity: 1509 (2014)
- Houses: Athenian, Corinthian, Spartan & Trojan
- Newspaper: The Saint
- Website: st-birinus-school.org.uk

St Birinus School, previously known as Didcot Boy's County Modern and Didcot Senior Boys, is a boys' academy in Didcot, Oxfordshire, England. St Birinus was founded in 1936 as a secondary modern before becoming a comprehensive in 1973. In September 2012 the school became an academy with the same name. St Birinus' key catchment area includes the town of Didcot and the surrounding rural area, from Harwell in the west to South Moreton in the east and from Long Wittenham in the north to Chilton in the south, however the school also caters for parents in other parts of Oxfordshire who wish their children to be educated in a single-sex environment. As of September 2019 the headteacher is Will Manning. The school is a dual specialist technology college and language college.

The school takes boys from the age of 11 until the end of their GCSEs at the age of 16. After this students may continue to the associated Didcot Sixth Form College for their A-levels. This mixed sixth form is shared with Didcot Girls' School and geographically spread across both school sites. As of January 2015 the most recent OFSTED inspection was in 2012 (prior to the school becoming an academy) and the school was given an overall rating of 'good'.

== History ==
In 1931 St Frideswide's School opened in Didcot as a coeducational secondary modern school. Then, in 1936, the Didcot Boy's County Modern school was opened in the town, enabling single sex education and, in 1951, the school acquired its present name: St Birinus School. The school is named for Birinus, the first Bishop of Dorchester, although the school is secular. In 1973 the school became a comprehensive school and in 1997 gained specialist technology college status. In 2006 the school became one of the first in Oxfordshire to acquire a second specialism: languages. In September 2012 the running of the school was transferred to a limited company, of the same name, when the school became an academy. In 2011 St Birinus announced its intention, in conjunction with Didcot Girls' School and Abingdon and Witney College, to bid to run a new academy school in the town, however their bid was not shortlisted by Oxfordshire County Council.

In 2006, the school celebrated its 70th anniversary.

== Campus ==
The school is primarily based around its Mereland Road site, however it has additional off-site sports facilities at the nearby Hagbourne Triangle. In recent years the school has updated many of their facilities including the science centre, mathematics block and humanities centre. The new Science Centre was constructed on the site of the old Greenmere Primary School, now relocated a short distance away.

The school shares its site with Didcot Leisure Centre and, thus, has access to additional sports and assembly facilities. Students at Didcot Sixth Form College also have access to facilities at Didcot Girls' School.

== Curriculum ==
As an academy St Birinus is required to follow the national curriculum in English, maths and science; however it has considerable freedom over the remaining aspects of its curriculum. At key stage 3 the school broadly follows the national curriculum. At key stage 4 the school offers a full range of "core" GCSEs, as well as further optional GCSEs and vocational qualifications such as BTECs. Through a partnership with Oxford University the school is able to offer Latin lessons to its GCSE pupils.

The school has made several attempts to integrate new technologies with teaching and learning, and, in 2006, received an excellence award from RM plc in recognition of this.

== Notable alumni ==
- Joel Cliffe, cricketer
- Ben Fergusson, writer
- Antony Hansen, actor and contestant on Any Dream Will Do
- Matt Richardson, comedian and co-host of The Xtra Factor
- Daniel Rivers, 2014 Commonwealth Games Gold and bronze medalist - 50m Rifle 3 Positions and 10m Air Rifle
- Ben Watson, 2014 Commonwealth Games Bronze medalist in weightlifting (105 kg Category) & 2018 Commonwealth Games competitor in weightlifting (105+ kg Category)
