= Gary O'Donnell =

Gary O'Donnell may refer to:

- Gary O'Donnell (Australian footballer) (born 1965), Australian rules footballer and coach
- Gary O'Donnell (British Army soldier) (1968–2008), British recipient of the George Medal and bar
- Gary O'Donnell (Gaelic footballer) (born 1988), Gaelic football player
