= Great Western Park =

Great Western Park may refer to:

- Great Western Park, Oxfordshire, a village in England
- Great Western Park, a park in Windsor, Ontario, Canada
- Great Western Park, a wildlife preserve in Oelwein, Iowa, United States
