= Vauxhall Barracks =

- Didcot
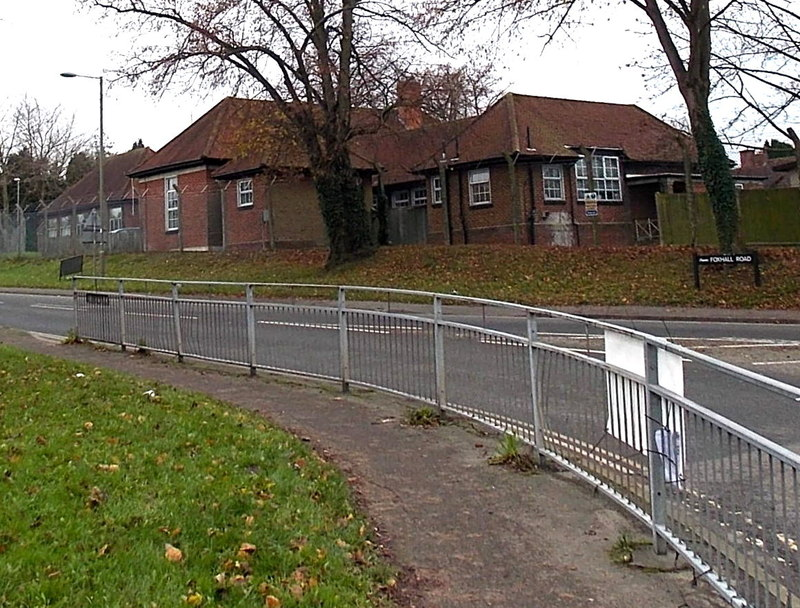
- Vauxhall Barracks

Site information
- Type: Barracks
- Owner: Ministry of Defence
- Operator: British Army

Location
- Location within Oxfordshire
- Coordinates: 51°36′28″N 01°14′41″W

Site history
- Built: 1910s
- Built for: War Office
- In use: 1910s-Present

Garrison information
- Occupants: 11 Explosive Ordnance Disposal and Search Regiment RLC

Vauxhall Barracks is a British Army installation in Didcot, Oxfordshire.

== History ==
The barracks were established during the First World War alongside a depot for storing explosives from Woolwich Arsenal. By the end of the War 1,900 troops were based there. Then during the Second World War elements of the Royal Berkshire Regiment were based at the barracks.

The ordnance depot closed in 1964 when operations were moved to Bicester; Didcot power station was built on the site. The barracks, though, were retained; since 1982 they have has been the home of 11 Explosive Ordnance Disposal and Search Regiment RLC. They are now known as Vauxhall Barracks.

== Based units ==
The following notable units are based at Vauxhall Barracks.

Royal Logistic Corps

- 11 Explosive Ordnance Disposal and Search Regiment
  - Headquarters 11 Explosive Ordnance Disposal & Search Regiment
  - 421 Explosive Ordnance Disposal & Search Squadron

== Future ==
In November 2016, the Ministry of Defence announced that the site would close in 2028. This was later extended to 2034.
