= MOD Ashchurch =

Vehicle storage facility for the UK MOD

- Tewkesbury, Gloucestershire, England
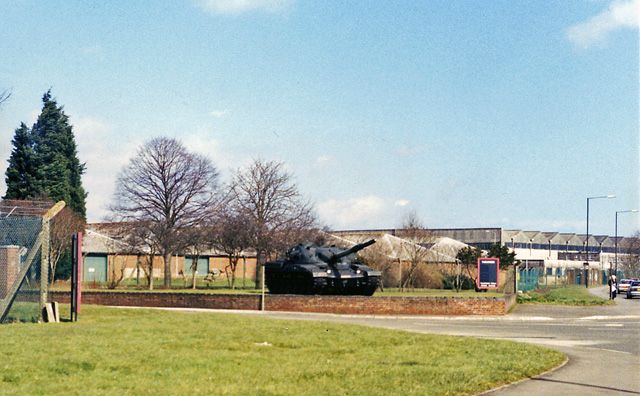

Site information
- Owner: Ministry of Defence
- Operator: British Army

Location
- Coordinates: 52°00′09″N 2°05′45″W
- Area: 80 hectares

Site history
- Built: 1938

MOD Ashchurch is the Ministry of Defence's primary vehicle storage and distribution site, managed by DE&S, in Tewkesbury, Gloucestershire. The site also includes St Barbara's Barracks, the headquarters for 721 EOD Squadron, Royal Logistic Corps. During the Second World War, it was an American ordnance supply depot, known as G-25.

== History ==
=== General Depot G-25 ===
The camp was created in 1938. The US Army arrived at Ashchurch in June 1942 taking it over from the Royal Army Service Corps, and it became General Depot G-25, the largest ordnance supply depot in the British Isles. The 624th Ordnance Base Automotive Battalion (OBAM) and 622nd OBAM, and likely others, were based at the camp. In August 1942, 3,000 men lived mainly in "squalid pyramidal bell tents." G-25 was reorganised in August 1943 by Major-General Lee, and became "something of a model installation... a show place" for visiting dignitaries.

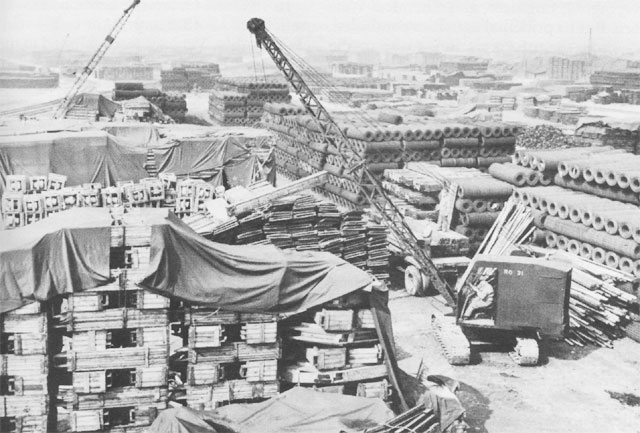
The General Depot at Ashchurch stocked with supplies for Operation Overlord, 1944

=== VSSP ===
In 2020, it was announced that Ashchurch had been chosen as the site for the MOD's Vehicle Storage and Support Programme (VSSP) and was to receive a £270million revamp. Demolitions on the site began in August 2022. In total, the programme will see the demolition of 58 older structures.

By 2027, when VSSP is due to complete, the site will have capacity to store 4,000 armoured and soft-skinned vehicles, such as tanks and Land Rovers, in a controlled humidity environment (CHE).

The first, and largest at 25,300m2, CHE storage building with capacity to house over 900 Army vehicles was completed in March 2025. A MAN HX truck was the first vehicle to enter the CHE facility.

As of April 2025, six out of a planned 14 new buildings had been built.

== St Barbara's Barracks ==
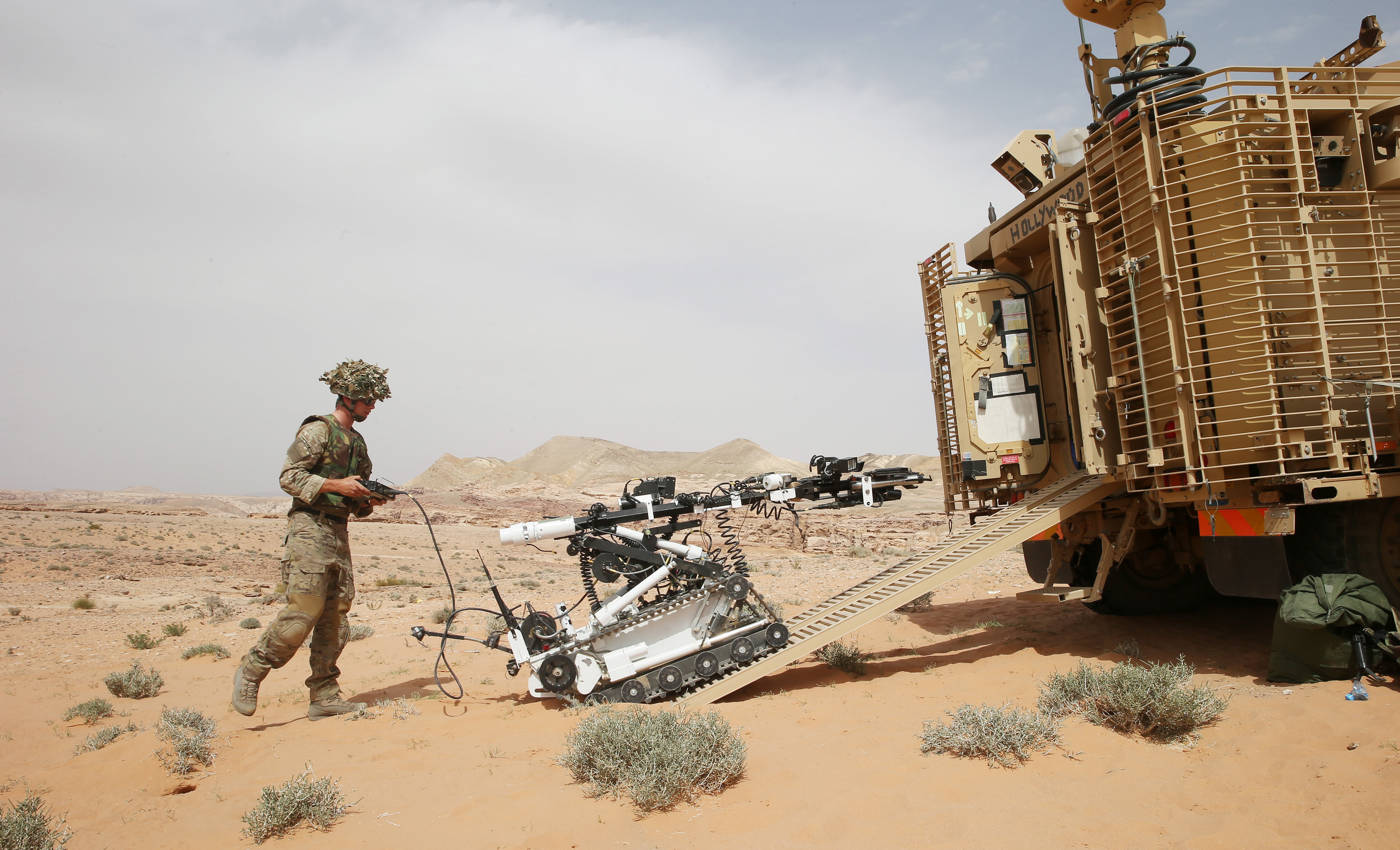
11 EOD Regiment RLC on Exercise Shamal Storm 16 in Jordan

St Barbara's Barracks is part of the larger MOD Ashchurch site. The barracks is the headquarters for 721 EOD Squadron, part of the 11 Explosive Ordnance Disposal and Search Regiment RLC. It is also home to the 721 EOD Squadron's Ashchurch Troop. The unit is responsible for detecting and disposing of mines, unexploded ammunition and improvised explosive devices.
