= Didcot Girls' School =

Location
- Manor Crescent; Didcot, Oxfordshire, OX11 7AJ; England; 51°36′24″N 1°15′14″W

Information
- Type: Secondary school
- Motto: Committed to Excellence
- Local authority: Oxfordshire County Council
- Department for Education URN: 138490 Tables
- Ofsted: Reports
- Chair of Governors: Teresa Brooke
- Headteacher: Georgina Littler
- Age: 11 to 18
- Enrolment: 1347 students (Years 7–11; 2022)
- Sixth form students: 215 (2022)
- Houses: Adie; Bussell; Ennis; Greenfield; Kennedy; MacArthur; Wilson
- Website: didcotgirls.oxon.sch.uk

Didcot Girls' School (also known as DGS) is a secondary school with academy status for girls, in Didcot, Oxfordshire. The current headteacher is Georgina Littler, who took over in May 2020.

The mixed-sex sixth form, known as Didcot Sixth Form, is shared with St Birinus School. The "Friends of Didcot Girls' School" charity was registered formally in 2020 to raise funds for the school.

== History ==
=== 1931–1973 ===
St. Frideswide's School, a mixed-sex school, opened in 1931. Didcot Senior Boys' School (later Didcot Boy's County Modern, and later St Birinus School) opened in September 1936. The boys from St Frideswide’s moved to this new school, and the girls remained. Students who passed the Eleven-plus moved to Wallingford Grammar School. Didcot Girls' Grammar School opened in September 1958, with the girls from Wallingford Grammar moving, and the boys remaining.

=== 1973–1976 ===
In 1973, St. Frideswide's Secondary Modern School and Didcot Girls' Grammar School merged to create Didcot Girls' School. Jessica E. Holloway, formerly headteacher of Didcot Girls' Grammar School, was made headteacher of the new Didcot Girls' School, with Edna Mary Lardner, formerly headteacher of St. Frideswide's School, being made deputy head. Holloway retired in 1976.

=== 1976–1985 ===
After Holloway retired, Lardner was appointed as headteacher of Didcot Girls'. Holloway died in December 1977. In 1981, Jennifer Cottee became headteacher. In 1985, Didcot Sixth Form, a shared, mixed-sex sixth form between Didcot Girls’ School and St Birinus School, was created.

=== 1987–2008 ===
Jeannette Hebbert, who was born and taught in the United States, became headteacher in 1987. The school was given Language College status in 1997. It was made a Beacon School in 2002. In 2003, Paula Taylor-Moore, head of Icknield Community College in Watlington from 1998–2003, was made headteacher. Didcot Girls' was given Applied Learning College status in 2006. In 2008, the school received Mathematics and Computing status.

=== 2009–2020 ===
Taylor-Moore retired in May 2009, with deputy head Fernand Dierckens taking over as acting head. A new permanent head, Rachael Warwick, was appointed in 2010.

In August 2012, the school converted to academy status. Warwick later became executive head of the Ridgeway Education Trust. In 2018, she became vice president of the Association of School and College Leaders in September 2018, and then president in 2019. In September 2018, Tom Goodenough became headteacher of Didcot Girls' School. In January 2020, Goodenough announced he would step down as head in May. In February 2020, the school announced that Georgina Littler would take over as headteacher when Goodenough stepped down.

=== 2021–present ===
In March 2025, a 14-year-old appeared in court, over allegations of possession of a 7.62 cm knife on the school grounds the previous year.

In 2023, Thames Valley Police received reports of sexual assault towards a pupil of Didcot Girls' School, regarding the then 50-year-old mother-of-two assistant headteacher Catherine Pearl, who joined the school in 2014. Pearl was charged in October 2024. In November 2024, she pleaded guilty to two counts of sexual activity with a girl as an adult abusing a position of trust. On 24 January 2025, during a hearing at Oxford Crown Court, she was sentenced to two years and four months in jail. Prosecutor Bethan Chichester said that Pearl had a "primary care" role of the girl, having one-to-ones with the girl in Pearl's office. During "exposure therapy" sessions, Pearl would caress the girl's leg and hair, asking her to do the same to Pearl. She also told the girl that if she were to "have an affair on her husband", it would be with the girl. She later began sexually touching the girl, and this continued for "some time", with the girl saying it "began to feel normal". The girl put an end to the "relationship" in January 2023, and attempted suicide on two occasions. The girl later stated that she had been diagnosed with PTSD. Judge Emma Nott, who sentenced Pearl, stated that "this was targeted abuse of a vulnerable person", and that she believes Pearl is "not sorry for what [she's] done".

In July 2025, Pearl won an appeal to replace her Sexual Harm Prevention Order (SHPO) with a new one. The former one, issued by Judge Nott, would have lasted 10 years, and made it so that Pearl would be required to inform police if she possessed any device that could access the internet, as well as if she lived with children. She would also have been prevented from being in contact with other children "unless [it was] inadvertent and unavoidable" and the children were supervised by parents or guardians who were aware of her convictions. This SHPO was replaced with a new one, banning Pearl from "seeking or holding any position of authority or care of children". This Order also lasts until January 2035, 10 years after Pearl was sentenced. Court of Appeal judges who made this change stated that the former order was "unnecessary and disproportionate", and included some "very onerous" restrictions. Pearl remains prohibited from contacting her victim via an indefinite restraining order, with the appeal judges stating there was "no evidence" Pearl is a risk to other children.

== Notable former pupils ==
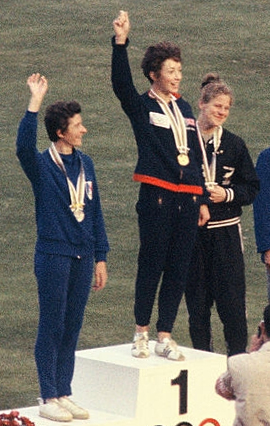
Ann Packer winning the 1964 Olympics 800 metres gold

- Henrietta Knight, English Thoroughbred racehorse trainer, attended predecessor Didcot Girls' Grammar School.
- Ann Packer, English former sprinter, hurdler and long jumper, attended predecessor Didcot Girls' Grammar School.
- Summer Watson, English soprano.
