= Athirty4 =

British street artist

Athirty4 (or sometimes known as @Athirty4 or A34 in a number of press articles) is a pseudonymous British-based, multi-disciplined street artist, whose artwork comprises plaster of Paris, photography, graphic design and illustration. His identity is unknown.

== Notable works ==
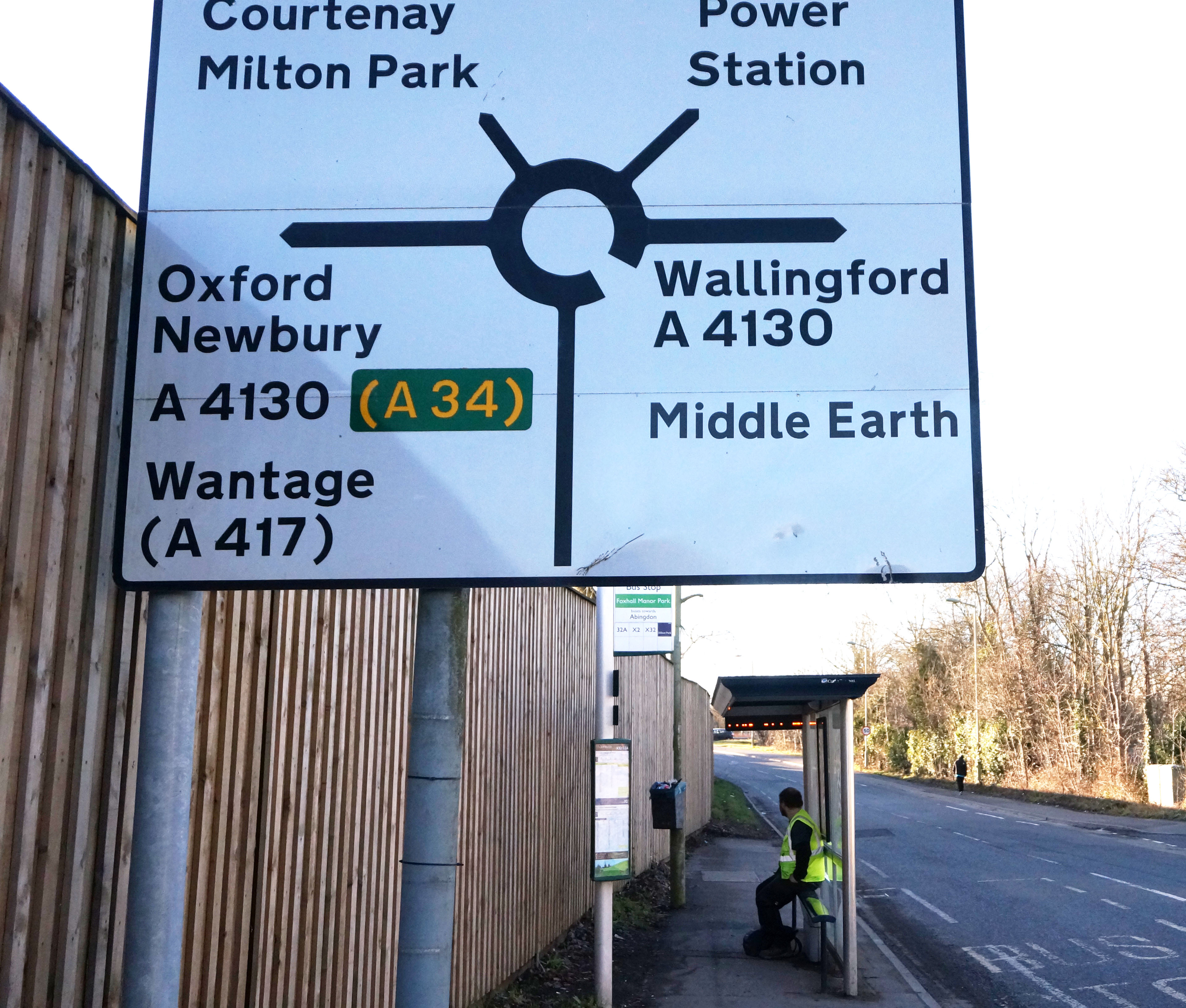
One of Athirty4's Didcot road signs. March 2018.

Athirty4's first publicly acknowledged piece appeared in March 2018, when he added some fictional fantasy names to road signs in Didcot, Oxfordshire. The names that he added included Gotham City, Emerald City, Middle Earth, Neverland, and Narnia. Athirty4 said that he added the names so that people would no longer think of Didcot as the most boring town in England. The Didcot council did not view the signs favourably. Initially, there was speculation who had created the signs, as Athirty4 had left no clues that it was he who was behind the altered road signs.

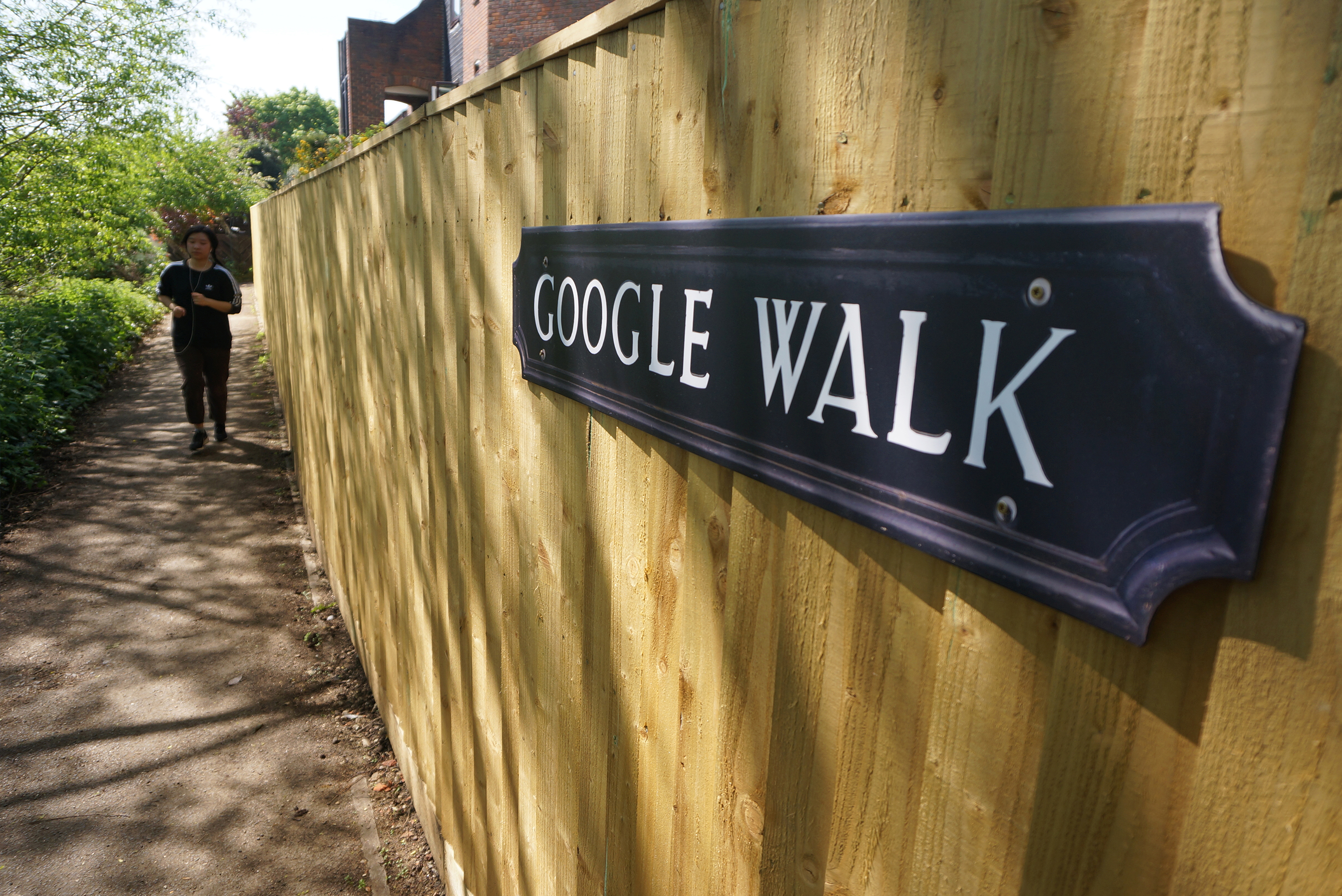
One of the many social media street signs that appeared across Oxford, May 2018.

In May 2018, Athirty4 created a series of social media-inspired street signs and added them to streets and roads in Oxford. His signs were a comment about the misuse of personal data by a number of social media companies. He said, "Our relationship with social media is like a modern Gothic tale. The social media companies sucking data from us like vampires drinking blood."

In the same month, he used an abandoned washing machine, which he found in an Oxford underpass, and turned it into a readymade by placing a printed statement above the machine. The statement read, "Please use this washing machine to cleanse your mind of all prejudices and negative preconceptions relating to contemporary art. The work triggered a debate whether it represented a piece of art or was merely an act of fly-tipping.

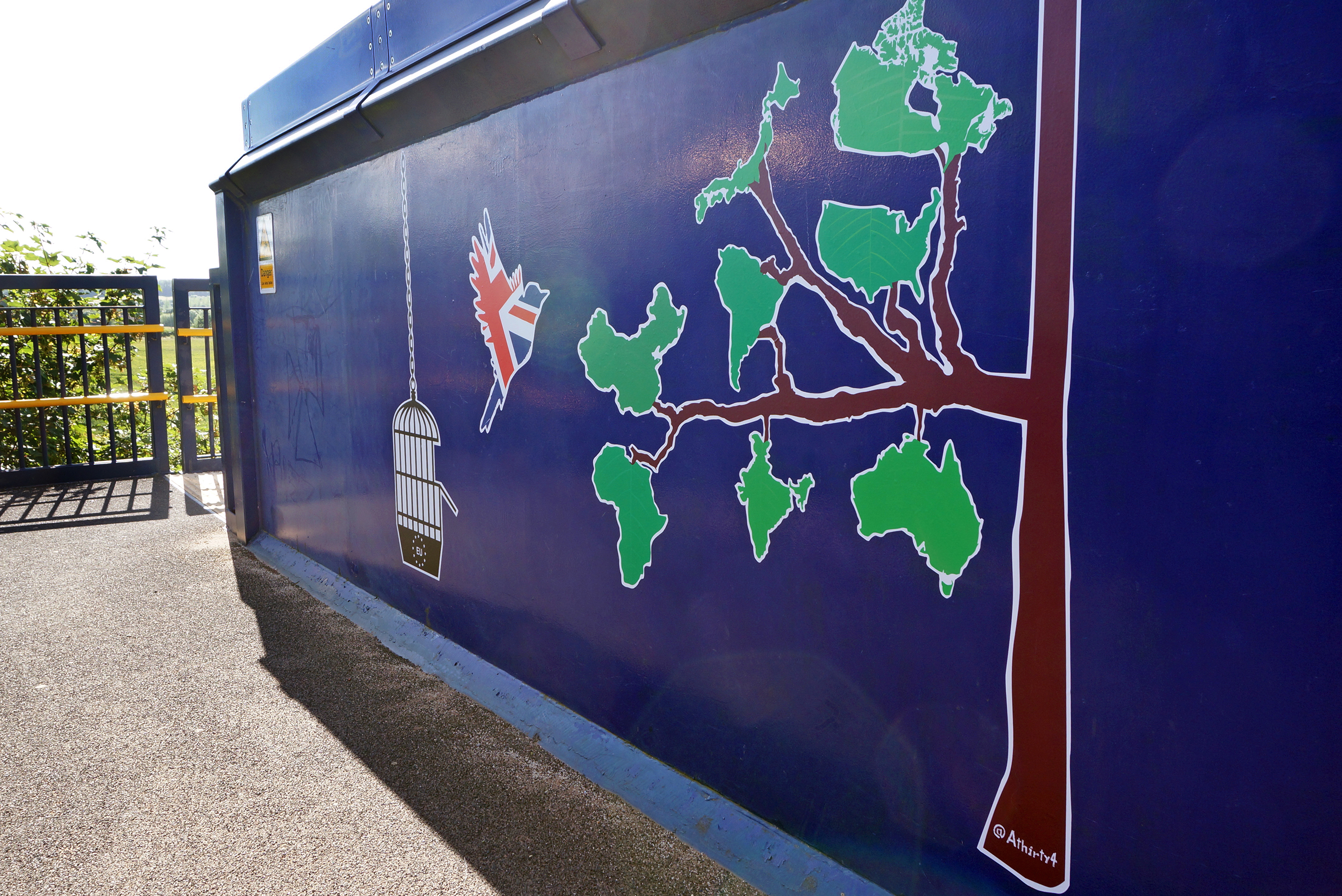
A mural exploring the idea of life outside the EU, which appeared on a bridge at Radley railway station, June 2018.

The theme of Brexit has cropped up in several of Athirty4's artworks. Two pieces appeared in June 2018: a large mural on a bridge at Radley railway station and a photographic piece, featuring Jean-Claude Juncker, on the side of a derelict building in Oxford. And in 2019, Athirty4 revisited the subject when he created over a hundred hand-made, misshapen plaster of Paris milk bottles and subsequently left them on people's doorsteps in a handful of towns across Oxfordshire and Berkshire. The misshapen bottles were a metaphor for the type of post-Brexit trade deals that the UK government was considering at the time.

An Oxford McDonald's fast food franchise attracted the attention of Athirty4 in 2018. He applied a large satirical graphic on the front window of a shop next to the McDonald's on Cornmarket Street in the centre of Oxford. The window graphic comprised imagery that criticised McDonald's for using unsustainable palm oil in its food.

In October 2019, a series of plaster of Paris light switches appeared in Oxford. There was speculation what the artwork meant, as there was no explanation accompanying the light switches.

The Coronavirus gave Athirty4 the opportunity to create a number of artworks relating to the subject. One of them saw him produce a collection of handcrafted kites, which he placed in dozens of trees on Stapleton Road, opposite the Jenner Institute, where the Oxford AstraZeneca Covid 19 vaccine was being created. Each kite carried a note on the end of their tale, which stated, "The Covid-19 vaccine is a gust of hope that will help to free us from the trees." Athirty4 also created an installation outside a Boots the chemist shop, mocking people who were panic buying toilet rolls.

An environmental theme also popped up in one of Athirty4's works, with a project called 'Vocal Gnomes', comprising hand-made garden gnomes, each one carrying an environmental message on a placard. The gnomes were left in privately owned front gardens, where the owners had concreted over their lawns in order to provide space for their cars.

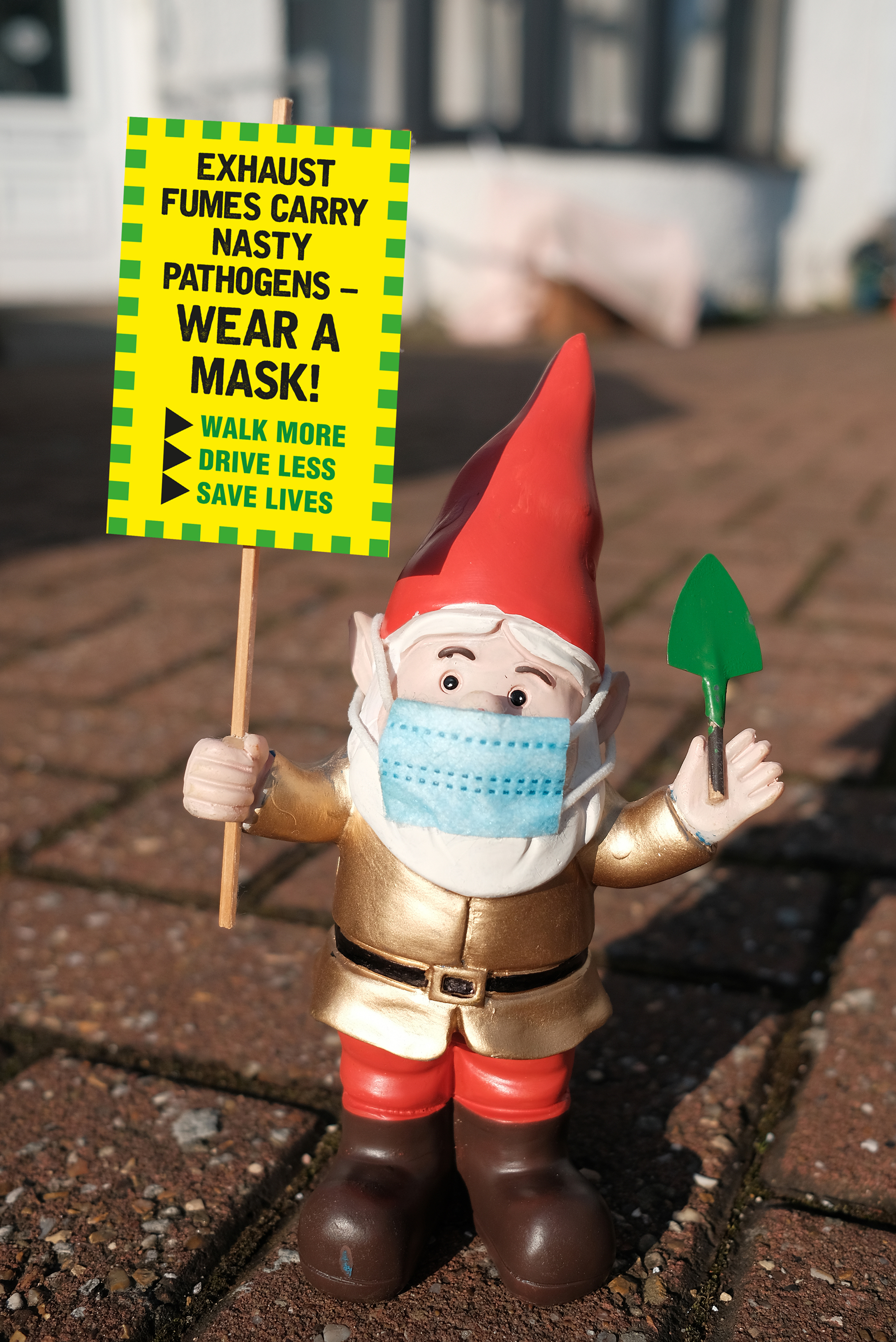
A Vocal Gnome, protesting at the loss of his front garden. May 2021.

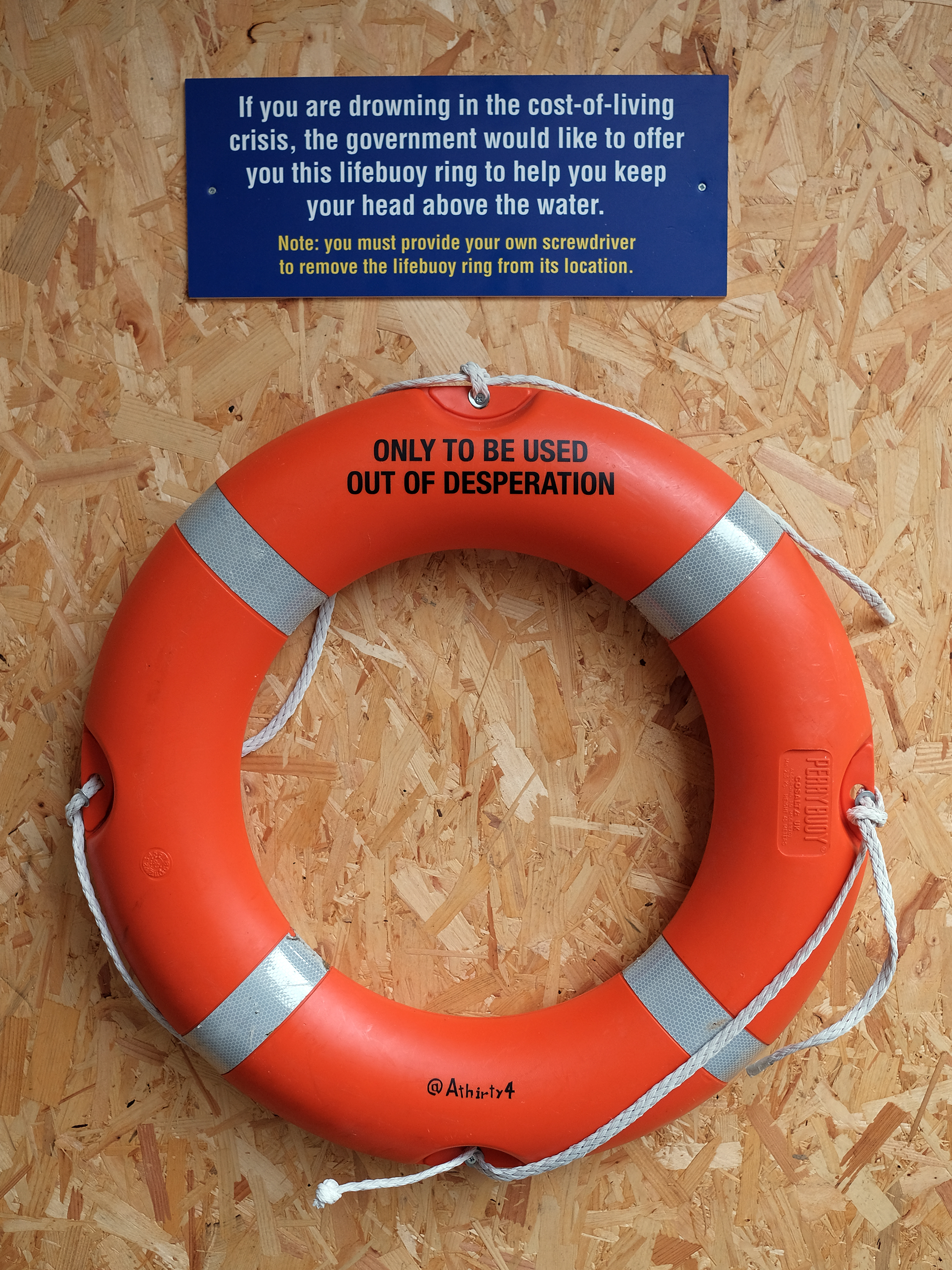
A life-size lifebuoy, screwed to a wooden hoarding on Catte Street, Oxford, July 2022.

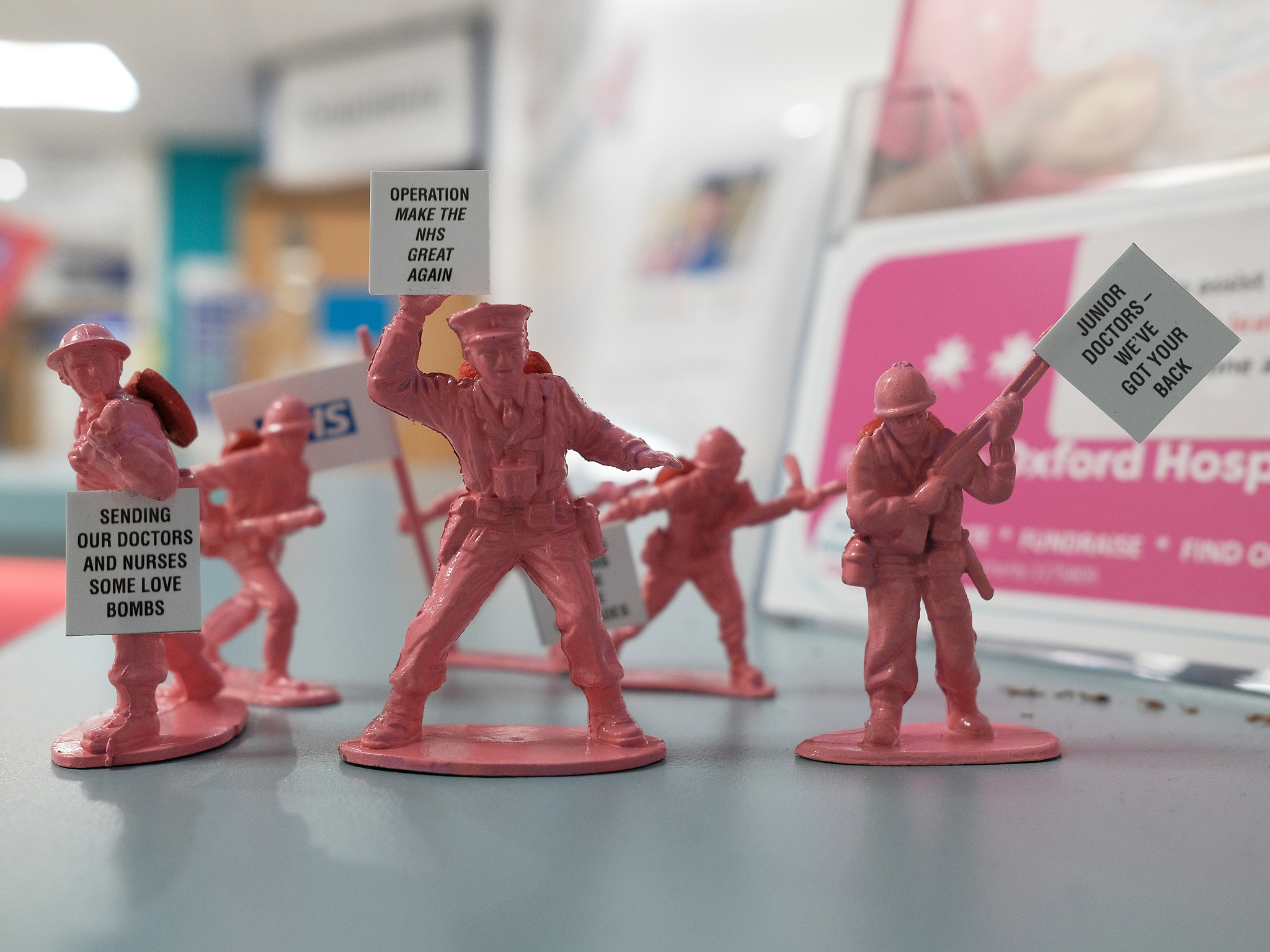
Some toy soldiers that were part of The Pink Army project at the John Radcliffe Hospital.

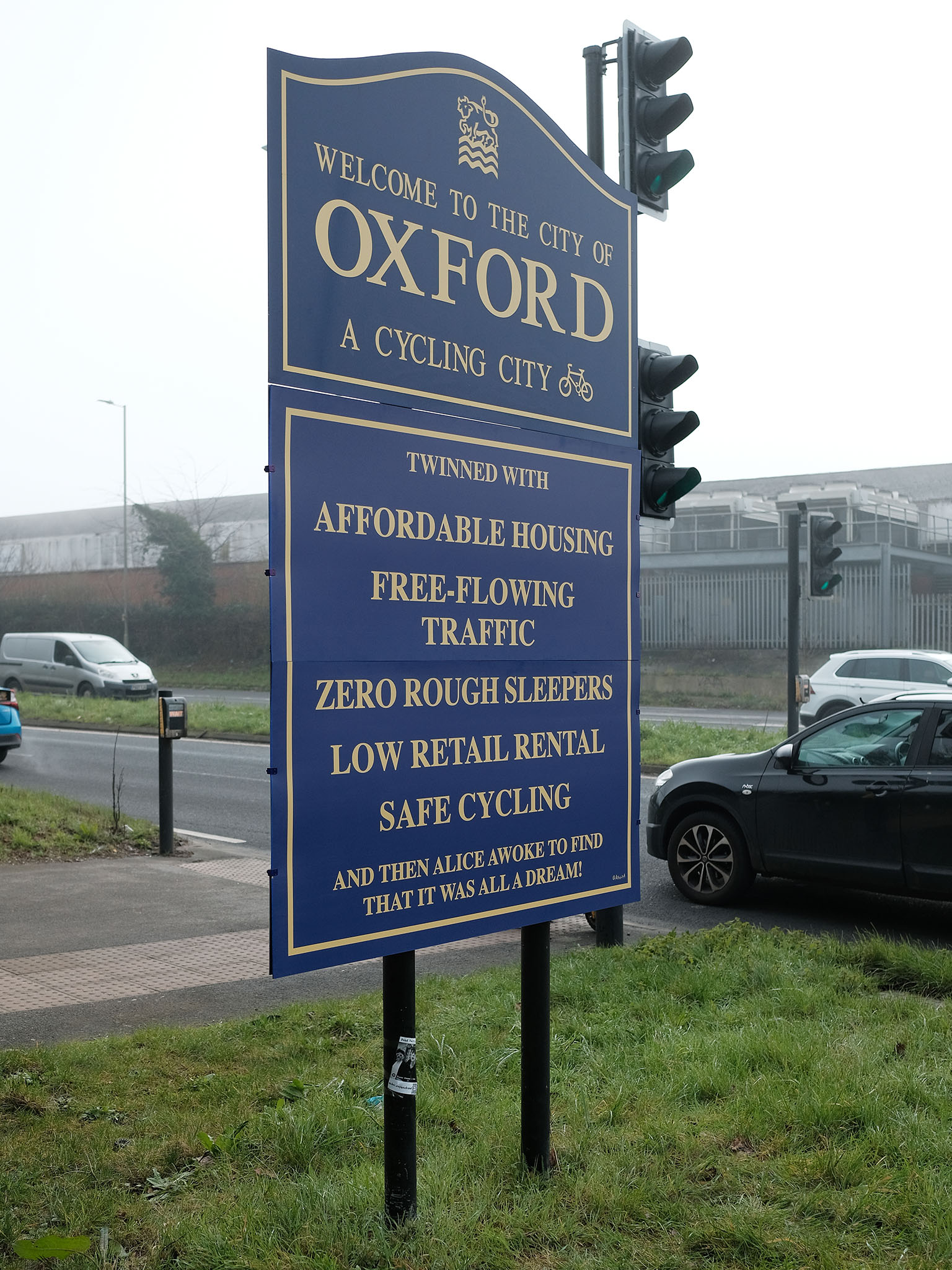
A twinned-with road sign in Oxford, which was altered by artist Athirty4 in March 2024.

In November 2021, he initiated a project called BlackThursday21, which was a direct criticism of Black Friday. His project saw him hang dozens of black canvases with humorous statements embossed on them in public places in Banbury, Littlemore, Abingdon, Cowley and Kidlington (the first letters of each place name spelling the word 'BLACK'). The artist was aiming to inspire other artists to create artworks to give away for free. "The antithesis of Black Friday," Athirty4 stated.

One of his most recent works, called Product Placement, focused on the subject of litter. He created a wooden bin and filled it with hand-crafted plaster of Paris objects, all based on real pieces of litter that he'd picked up during his time as a litter picker. He erected the bin on St. Giles, Oxford. He also placed the remainder of his litter-inspired plaster of Paris artworks on pavements and roads in Oxford and several other cities. Speaking about the project, he said, "We're all so used to seeing litter on our streets, a permanent tide mark, if you like, that it will be hard for people to differentiate my artworks from real litter."

During July 2022, Athirty4 screwed a full-size lifebuoy to a wooden hoarding on Catte Street, Oxford, which drew attention to the UK's cost-of-living crisis. Above the lifebuoy, a sign read: “If you are drowning in the cost-of-living crisis, the government would like to offer you this lifebuoy ring to help you keep your head above the water. Note: You must provide your own screwdriver to remove the lifebuoy ring from its location.”

In April 2023, Athirty4 placed hundreds of pink toy soldiers in the John Radcliffe Hospital in Oxford. The soldiers had hand-made pink hearts on their backs and also featured small messages attached to the ends of their guns. One message read, 'Sending our doctors and nurses some love bombs'. The project was called The Pink Army and it supported the junior doctors' strike, which took place between Tuesday 11 April until Saturday 15th.

During March 2024, Athirty4 altered an Oxford 'Twin City' sign on the Eastern Bypass (A4142), adding a new section over the top of it with a tongue-in-cheek message printed on it, which read, "Affordable housing, free-flowing traffic, zero rough sleepers, low-retail rental and safe cycling". And in small print at the bottom, "And then Alice awoke to find that it was all a dream!"

In December 2024, @Athirty4 used over 20 Dallas Simpson reproduction paintings as a source of inspiration for a project called "Brave New World". He reworked Simpson's reproductions by adding a speech bubble to each image. The speech bubbles comprised messages relating to contemporary themes such as AI technology, identity politics, social media, consumerism and more. He then surreptitiously placed his reimagined artworks in over 15 charity shop windows in Oxford. He didn't add a price tag to his images, as he wanted the charity shops to decide the value of each artwork.
