= 11 Explosive Ordnance Disposal and Search Regiment RLC =

11 Explosive Ordnance Disposal & Search Regiment RLC
- Active: 1972 - Present
- Country: United Kingdom
- Branch: British Army
- Role: Military Aid to the Civil Authority
- Size: Regiment; 658 personnel
- Garrison/HQ: Vauxhall Barracks, Didcot
- Corps: Royal Logistic Corps

Insignia
- Tactical recognition flash

11 Explosive Ordnance Disposal and Search Regiment RLC is a specialist regiment of the British Army's Royal Logistic Corps (RLC) responsible for counter terrorist Explosive Ordnance Disposal (EOD), the safe recovery or disposal of conventional munitions. The regiment also has an ammunition inspectorate role supporting the Inspector Explosives (Army). With headquarters in Didcot, the regiment has sub units geographically based throughout the UK to provide a nationwide high readiness response capability in support of the police.

== History ==
The regiment's history commences in the period immediately after World War II. At the time, the regional Commands HQs across the UK established Ammunition Inspectorates to oversee the drawdown of the vast stockpiles of ammunition in numerous sub depots across the country, much of it was still stocked alongside many of the roads in the countryside. These Command Ammunition Inspectorates, Northern Command, Southern Command etc. were eventually grouped into one unit, 1 Ammunition Inspection and Disposal Unit RAOC, which formed on 15 March 1972 at Salisbury.

In April 1982, 1 Ammo IDU became 11 Ordnance Battalion (EOD) and was relocated to Didcot. On 5 April 1993, the battalion was retitled to 11 EOD Regiment RLC, following the formation of the RLC. In June 2018 the Regiment was renamed to 11 Explosive Ordnance Disposal and Search Regiment RLC, in recognition of the importance of Search within the Explosive Ordnance Disposal community.

== Role ==
The unit is responsible for providing EOD (Improvised Explosive Device Disposal (IEDD), Conventional Munitions Disposal (CMD), Biological and Chemical Munitions Disposal (BCMD) and Radiological and Nuclear Munitions Disposal) and Ammunition Technical support to Defence and Other Government Departments, in order to support Land Forces Command Capability on UK mainland (Great Britain & Northern Ireland) and overseas.

== Structure ==
The structure is as follows:

- Headquarters, 11 Explosive Ordnance Disposal and Search Regiment RLC, at Vauxhall Barracks, Didcot
- Headquarters, 321 EOD & Search Squadron RLC, at Alexander Barracks, Aldergrove (based across Northern Ireland)
- Headquarters, 421 EOD & Search Squadron RLC, at Vauxhall Barracks, Didcot
- Headquarters, 521 EOD Squadron RLC, at Piave Lines, Catterick Garrison (based across the North of England and Scotland)
  - Catterick Troop, at Catterick Garrison
  - Chester Troop, at Dale Barracks, Chester
  - Edinburgh Troop, at Dreghorn Barracks, Edinburgh
- Headquarters, 621 EOD Squadron RLC, at RAF Northolt (based across the South of England)
  - Aldershot Troop, at Aldershot Garrison
  - Colchester Troop, at Colchester Garrison
  - Northolt Troop, at RAF Northolt
  - Shorncliffe Troop, at Risborough Barracks, Shorncliffe
- Headquarters, 721 EOD Squadron RLC, at St Barbara's Barracks, MOD Ashchurch (based across the Midlands)
  - Ashchurch Troop, at St Barbara's Barracks, MOD Ashchurch
  - Nuneaton Troop, at Gamecock Barracks, Bramcote
  - Tidworth Troop, at Tidworth Camp

== Notable personnel ==
- Gary O'Donnell
- Olaf Schmid
- Karl Ley
- Lisa Head
- Kim Hughes

== Honours ==
The Regiment is based at Vauxhall Barracks, Didcot, Oxfordshire having moved there from Old Sarum in 1982. Due to its long and close association with the town, the Regiment was awarded the Freedom of Didcot on 17 September 2007 and were conferred "the honour and distinction of exercising all customary Regimental Privileges when parading in or marching through the Town of Didcot". The Regiment exercised its right to march through the town of Didcot on 22 September 2007, led by the Commanding Officer Lt Col RL Maybery QGM RLC.

On 19 November 2010, in a ceremony at Didcot Parkway railway station, a High Speed Train locomotive, no. 43087 operated by Great Western Railway (FGW), was named 11 Explosive Ordnance Disposal Regiment Royal Logistic Corps. The ceremony was attended by Lt Col Gareth Bex (Commanding Officer); soldiers of the Regiment; Mark Hopwood, of FGW; Keith Mitchell, leader of the county council; and the MP for Wantage, Ed Vaizey.

On 15 March 2018 the regiment was awarded the Firmin Sword of Peace, one of the highest accolades that can be bestowed upon a military unit. The award reflected in particular the regiment's specialist search operations during the Didcot Power Station tragedy (Operation BRIDLED) and the safe disposal of the hazardous chemical 2,4-Dinitrophenylhydrazine (DNPH) from school laboratories nationwide, which posed an explosive threat to UK school children (Op MATSU).
