= Great Western Park, Oxfordshire =

Village in Oxfordshire, England

Coordinates: 51.605°N 1.271°W

Great Western Park
- Location within Oxfordshire
- OS grid reference: SU5190
- Civil parish: Western Valley; Didcot
- District: Vale of White Horse; South Oxfordshire
- Shire county: Oxfordshire
- Region: South East
- Country: England
- Sovereign state: United Kingdom
- Post town: Didcot
- Postcode district: OX11
- Dialling code: 01235
- Police: Thames Valley
- Fire: Oxfordshire
- Ambulance: South Central
- UK Parliament: Didcot and Wantage

Great Western Park is a village immediately west of Didcot, Oxfordshire, England consisting of 3,300 houses, built in the 2010s. It lies on the border between the districts of Vale of White Horse and South Oxfordshire, with the central area being administered under Western Valley parish in Vale of White Horse (split from Harwell parish in 2023) whilst Great Western Park North and South are administered as part of Didcot, in South Oxfordshire.

== Education ==
Didcot Primary Academy opened in 2016. There are two secondary schools in Great Western Park estate: UTC Oxfordshire (ages 14–19) opened in 2015, and Aureus School (ages 11–16) opened in 2017.

== Culture and sport ==
In 2012, a new road was named Sir Frank Williams Avenue in honour of Williams' contribution to Didcot.

Boundary Park, a park straddling the border between the districts, has facilities including tennis and netball courts. Boundary Park had been due to hold a free pride festival in August 2024 but it was cancelled for safety reasons.

Didcot Cricket Club's current home ground is at Boundary Park in Great Western Park.
