= Joel Cliffe =

English cricketer

Personal information
- Full name: Joel Alexander Cliffe
- Born: 2 April 1980 (age 46); Oxford, Oxfordshire, England
- Batting: Left-handed
- Bowling: Left-arm medium-fast

Domestic team information
- Years: Team
- 2001: Cambridge UCCE

Career statistics
Competition	First-class
Matches	3
Runs scored	2
Batting average	0.66
100s/50s	–/–
Top score	2
Balls bowled	316
Wickets	2
Bowling average	95.00
5 wickets in innings	–
10 wickets in match	–
Best bowling	2/71
Catches/stumpings	–/–
- Source: Cricinfo, 13 August 2020

Joel Alexander Cliffe (born 2 April 1980) is an English former first-class cricketer.

Joel was born at Oxford in April 1980. He was educated at St Birinus School, before going up to Gonville and Caius College, Cambridge. While studying at Cambridge, Cliffe played first-class cricket in 2001, making three appearances for Cambridge UCCE against Kent, Essex and Sussex. He took 2 wickets from the 53 overs in total that he bowled across his three matches.
