= Gary O'Donnell (British Army soldier) =

British Army soldier

Warrant Officer Class 2 Gary John O'Donnell GM & Bar
- Born: 21 July 1968; Edinburgh, Scotland
- Died: 10 September 2008 (aged 40) near Musa Qala, Helmand Province, Afghanistan
- Burial place: Leamington Spa, England
- Military career
- Allegiance: United Kingdom
- Branch: British Army
- Service years: 1992–2008
- Rank: Warrant Officer Class 2
- Nickname: Gaz
- Service number: 25018197
- Units: 11 Explosive Ordnance Disposal Regiment, Royal Logistic Corps
- Conflicts: Northern Ireland; Iraq War; War in Afghanistan
- Awards: George Medal & Bar

Warrant Officer Class 2 Gary John O'Donnell, GM & Bar (21 July 1968 – 10 September 2008) was a British Army bomb disposal expert who was awarded the George Medal twice. The George Medal is the second highest decoration, after the George Cross, for "acts of great bravery" not "in the face of the enemy". His second George Medal was the first such award in 26 years and the first ever posthumous bar. O'Donnell was killed in an improvised explosive device (IED) attack in Afghanistan.

== Early life ==
Born in Edinburgh, O'Donnell was educated at St Thomas of Aquin's High School.

== Military career ==
O'Donnell enlisted in the British Army in 1992, trained as an Ammunition Technician and was posted to 3 Base Ammunition Depot in Germany. After three tours of ammunition depots, he moved to 11 Explosive Ordnance Disposal Regiment Royal Logistic Corps as a Joint Service Improvised Explosive Device Disposal No. 1 Operator.

As a staff sergeant in 2004 he passed the RLC No 1 IEDD Course as a high-threat operator at the first attempt, one of a small percentage of candidates to do so. He subsequently undertook tours in Sierra Leone and Iraq as well as two tours of both Northern Ireland and Afghanistan.

=== Iraq War ===
By 2006 O'Donnell was employed as an IEDD operator in southern Iraq. He was awarded his first George Medal for "persistent courage" for his work in Basra. On 23 May 2006, rockets on a timing device were being fired at Basra Air station. When a rocket was discovered with the timer set, O'Donnell decided to minimise the risk to the airbase by manually disabling it as quickly as possible, which meant placing himself in the line of fire of the rocket.

=== War in Afghanistan ===
O'Donnell served one tour in Afghanistan in 2007 and returned in 2008. He worked defusing roadside bombs in Helmand Province, defusing 50 of the devices. On 26 August 2008 he was awarded the Long Service and Good Conduct Medal. In September 2008 O'Donnell was attempting to disarm an IED near Musa Qala, Helmand Province, when he was killed as he approached a booby-trapped bomb.

His body was returned to the UK and his funeral service was held on 29 September 2008. The service was accompanied by full military honours, and was followed by a cremation at Oakley Wood Crematorium, Bishop's Tachbrook.

== Legacy ==
The UK Defence Secretary Des Browne summarised O'Donnell's career by noting that "[O'Donnell] was personally responsible for saving thousands of the family, friends and comrades of others from the anguish that is currently being felt by his own."

On 6 March 2009, O'Donnell was posthumously awarded a Bar to his George Medal for "repeated and sustained acts of immense bravery" in Afghanistan. His Bar was the first to the George Medal awarded in 26 years.

The award was for two incidents:

- May 2008 – where he had to deal with a booby-trapped bomb in the Upper Gereshk Valley. After he defused this device he continued to search for others eventually finding and defusing 7 more devices. The task took 9 hours and was carried out in 40 °C heat.
- July 2008 – he was called to deal with a roadside bomb that was blocking the path of a convoy. He worked for 24 hours and found 11 devices. The Taliban attempted to detonate one as he approached, but it failed to go off.

O'Donnell's medals are in order of precedence;-

- George Medal and Bar
- General Service Medal With "Northern Ireland" clasp
- Operational Service Medal for Sierra Leone
- Iraq Medal
- Operational Service Medal for Afghanistan With "Afghanistan" clasp
- NATO Non-Article 5 medal with ISAF clasp
- Queen Elizabeth II Golden Jubilee Medal (UK)
- Accumulated Campaign Service Medal
- Long Service and Good Conduct Medal (Army)

In September 2013 O'Donnell's set of ten of his medals together with three letters on Buckingham Palace headed paper from Princess Anne, the colonel-in-chief of the Royal Logistic Corps, was sold at auction for £110,000.
