= UTC Oxfordshire =

Location
- Greenwood Way; Harwell; Didcot, Oxfordshire, OX11 6BZ; England; 51°36′18″N 1°16′26″W

Information
- Type: University Technical College
- Established: 2015
- Local authority: Oxfordshire
- Department for Education URN: 141111 Tables
- Ofsted: Reports
- Chair of Governors: Billy McNeil
- Executive Principal: Samantha Knowlton
- Gender: Mixed
- Age: 14 to 19
- Enrolment: 321
- Capacity: 600
- Website: www.utcoxfordshire.org.uk

UTC Oxfordshire is a mixed University Technical College located in Harwell, Oxfordshire, England. It opened in 2015 and caters for students aged 14–19 years.

The UTC's sponsors are Activate Learning, the UK Atomic Energy Authority, RM, Mini, Royal Holloway University of London and the University of Reading.

== Curriculum ==
UTC Oxfordshire begins the day at 8:40 and finishes at 15:50, except on Fridays which ends 2 hours early. It attempts to provide the students with a full GCSE offer and industry-standard technical qualifications. Students enter either at the start of Key Stage 4, in year 10, or at the start of Key Stage 5, the sixth form.

=== Key Stage 4 ===
UTC Oxfordshire offers 13 GCSEs, a level 2 certificate in Further Maths, and 2 Cambridge Nationals qualifications.

=== Key Stage 5 ===
UTC Oxfordshire offers both BTEC and A-levels.
