= Christopher Elderfield =

English clergyman and theologian

Christopher Elderfield (1607–1652) was an English clergyman and theologian.

== Life ==
The son of William Elderfield, he was born at Harwell, Berkshire, where he was baptised 11 April 1607. He studied at a local school kept by Hugh Lloyd, M.A., the vicar, and in 1621 he entered St. Mary Hall, Oxford, as a batler. In due course he took the two degrees in arts and entered into holy orders.

After holding some minor appointments, one of which was as curate at Coates, Essex, he became rector of Burton, Sussex. The duties of this post were as private chaplain to Sir William Goring, whose residence, Burton Place, was the only dwelling-house in the parish. There Elderfield devoted himself to study.

He died 2 December 1652 at Burton Place. In his will he directed that he should be buried in the chancel of his church, but this privilege was refused by Sir William Goring, because (it was alleged) he was disappointed in a legacy he expected to receive, and the body was laid in the nave.

== Legacy ==
Elderfield had left the bulk of his property to his native parish of Harwell; money was expended in the purchase of land in South Moreton, and by a decree in chancery the remaining sum. was handed to the churchwardens of the neighbouring village of Hagbourne for charitable purposes. He also left £36 for the benefit of ejected ministers, He bequeathed to the university of Oxford his manuscript of 'Lyra on the Psalms,' 'Rodolphus, his Postills,' and a copy of 'Clemens Romanus,' bound up with a 'Tract on Purgatory.'

== Works ==
In 1650 he published 'The Civill Right of Tythes,' London, a work of both law and theology. Of Regeneration and Baptism, Hebrew and Christian, Lond. 1653, was published after his death by his executors.
