= Aureus School =

Location
- Candytuft Way; Didcot, Oxfordshire, OX11 6FF; England; 51°36′20″N 1°16′25″W

Information
- Type: Secondary school
- Established: c. September 2017
- Sister school: Aureus Primary School
- Trust: GLF Schools
- Department for Education URN: 140653 Tables
- Ofsted: Reports
- Head teacher: Kirsty Rogers
- Gender: Mixed
- Age: 11 to 16
- Enrolment: 475 (2024)
- Capacity: 1200
- Houses: Spires; Bodleian; Trinity; Ashmolean
- Website: aureusschool.org

Aureus School is a secondary school in Didcot, Oxfordshire, England. The school, located in Great Western Park, officially opened to student in September 2017. As of September 2023, the school's headteacher is Kirsty Rogers.

== History ==
Named after a hoard of gold coins found in Didcot in around 1995, plans for Aureus School were originally submitted to Vale of White Horse District Council around August 2015. At this time, it was stated that, should these plans be approved, the school would open in September 2017. Updated plans for the school were submitted in October 2016.

The school's first headteacher, Hannah Wilson, was given the keys to the £19 million building in May 2017. The school opened to students for the first time, as planned, in September 2017. On opening, Wilson appointed Julie Hunter as deputy headteacher for Culture and Wellbeing.

Wilson also became headteacher of Aureus Primary School when it opened in September 2018. She stepped down as headteacher of the schools in May 2019, with Hunter becoming acting headteacher of the secondary school.

Thames Valley Police officers were called to Aureus School on 28 March 2022, after a teenage boy received minor injuries after being assaulted with an unknown object at the school. On 29 and 30 March, the school was inspected by Ofsted for the first time, and was given an overall rating of "requires improvement". Ofsted revisited the school for a monitoring visit in July 2023. They kept their rating of requires improvement, saying the school's leaders had "made progress to improve the school, but more work is necessary for the school to become good".

Hunter lead the school as headteacher until Kirsty Rogers took over in September 2023. In November 2023, King Charles III and Queen Camilla visited Aureus School, where students held signs wishing Charles a happy 75th birthday. The school was inspected by Ofsted in October 2023, and was given its first overall Good rating.

In June 2026, Thames Valley Police's police and crime commissioner, Matthew Barber, announced at Aureus School that secondary schools in the area would be able to apply for a share of £255,000 of police funding in order to help enforce a phone ban. Rogers said that a phone ban at Aureus has been "transformative", and that the school has "seen a notable improvement in students' focus, engagement in lessons, and the quality of social interaction across the school day".

In August 2026, the school saw its highest GCSE grades it had ever had, including substantial improvements in English and Mathematics.
