= Didcot =

Town in South Oxfordshire, England

Coordinates: 51°36′22″N 1°14′28″W

- Town
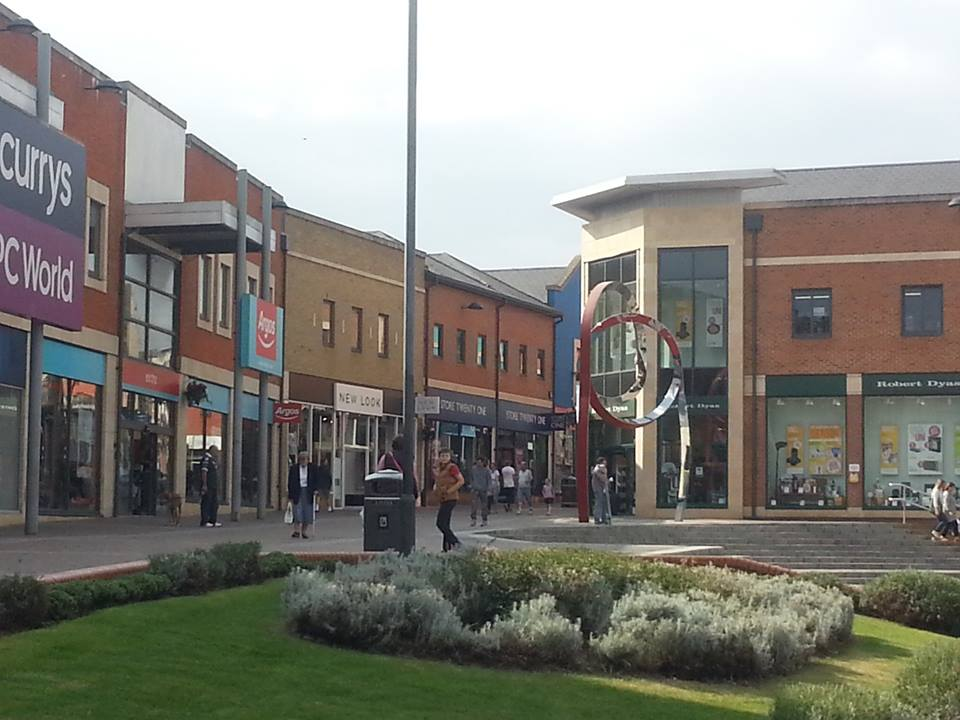
- Didcot town centre, including the modern art installation The Swirl

- Location within Oxfordshire
- Area: 8.48 km^{2} (3.27 sq mi)
- Population: 32,183 (2021 Census)
  - Density: 3,795/km^{2} (9,830/sq mi)
- OS grid reference: SU525900
  - London: 88.0 km (54.7 miles)
- Civil parish: Didcot
- District: South Oxfordshire
- Shire county: Oxfordshire
- Region: South East
- Country: England
- Sovereign state: United Kingdom
- Post town: Didcot
- Postcode district: OX11
- Dialling code: 01235
- Police: Thames Valley
- Fire: Oxfordshire
- Ambulance: South Central
- UK Parliament: Didcot and Wantage
- Website: Didcot Town Council

Didcot (/ˈdɪdkɒt, -kət/ DID-kot, -kət) is a railway town and civil parish in South Oxfordshire, England, located 15 miles (24 km) south of Oxford, 10 miles (16 km) east of Wantage and 15 miles (24 km) north west of Reading. Historically part of Berkshire, the town is noted for its railway heritage, Didcot station opening as a junction station on the Great Western Main Line in 1844.

Today the town is known for the railway museum and as the gateway town to the Science Vale: three large science and technology centres in the surrounding villages of Milton (Milton Park), Culham (Culham Science Centre) and Harwell (Harwell Science and Innovation Campus which includes the Rutherford Appleton Laboratory).

== History ==
=== Ancient and Medieval eras ===
The area around present-day Didcot has been inhabited for at least 9,000 years. A large archaeological dig between 2010 and 2013 produced finds from the Mesolithic, Neolithic, Iron Age and Bronze Age. In the Roman era the inhabitants of the area tried to drain the marshland by digging ditches through what is now the Ladygrove area north of the town near Long Wittenham, evidence of which was found during surveying in 1994. A hoard of 126 gold Roman coins dating from about 160 was found just outside the village in 1995 by an enthusiast with a metal detector. It is now displayed at the Ashmolean Museum on loan from the British Museum.

The Domesday Book of 1086 does not record Didcot. In 13th-century records the toponym appears as Dudecota, Dudecote, Doudecote, Dudcote or Dudecothe. Some of these spellings continued into later centuries, and were joined by Dodecote from the 14th century onward, Dudcott from the 16th century onward and Didcott from the 17th century onward. It is derived from Old English, meaning the house or shelter of Dudda's people. The name is believed to be derived from that of Dida, a 7th-century Mercian sub-king who ruled the area around Oxford and was the father of Saint Frithuswith or Frideswide, now the patron saint of both Oxford and Oxford University.

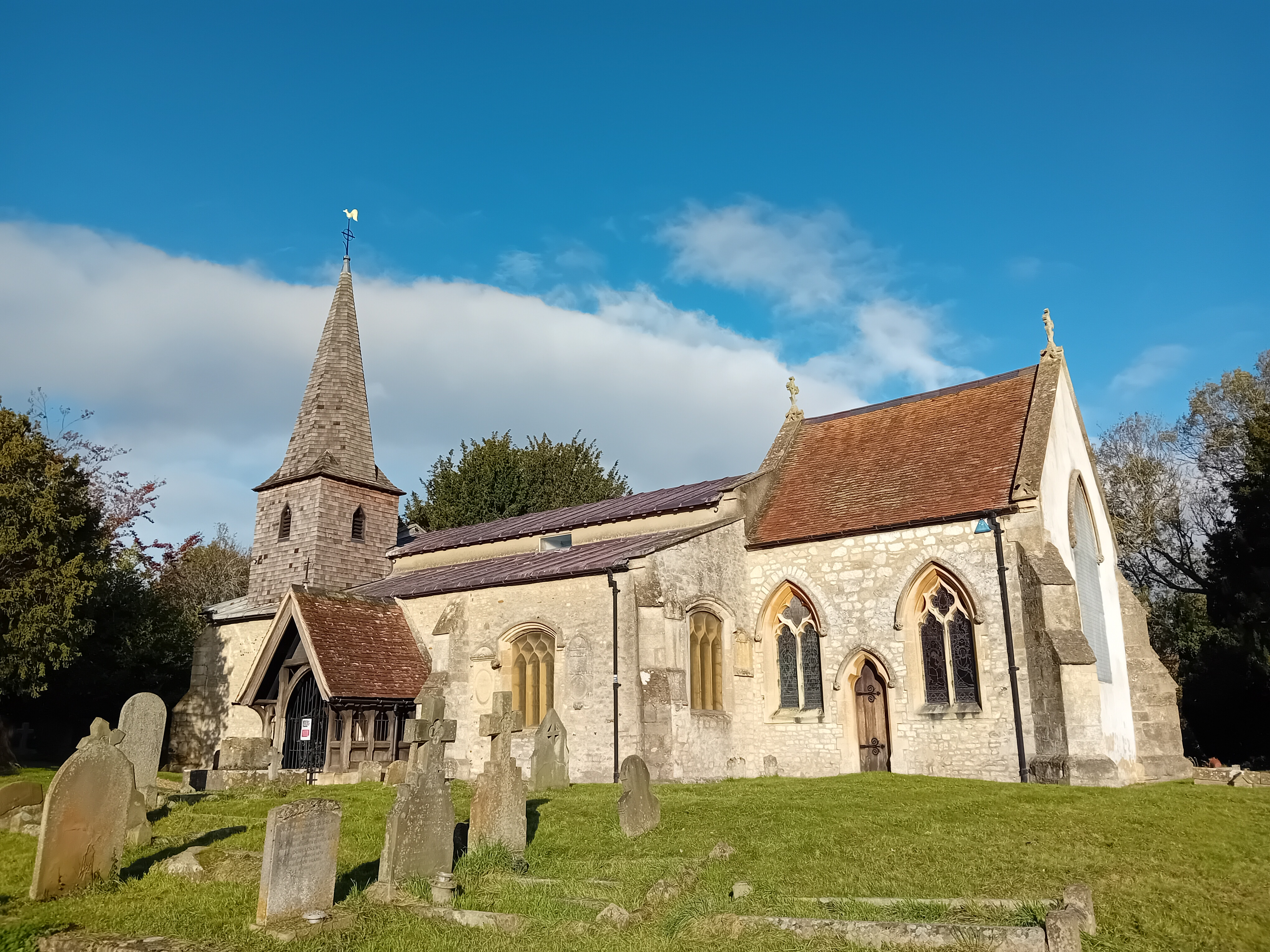
All Saints' parish church, parts of which go back to the 12th century

Didcot was then a rural Berkshire village, and it remained so for centuries, only occasionally appearing in records. If Didcot existed at the time of the Domesday Book in 1086, it will have been much smaller than several surrounding villages, including Harwell and Long Wittenham, that modern Didcot now dwarfs. The nearest settlement recorded in the Domesday Book was Wibalditone, with 21 inhabitants and a church, whose name possibly survives in Willington's Farm on the edge of Didcot's present-day Ladygrove Estate. The oldest parts of the Church of England parish church of All Saints go back to the 12th century. They include the walls of the nave and east wall of the chancel, which were built about 1160. The church is a Grade II* listed building.

=== Early modern era and the coming of the railways ===
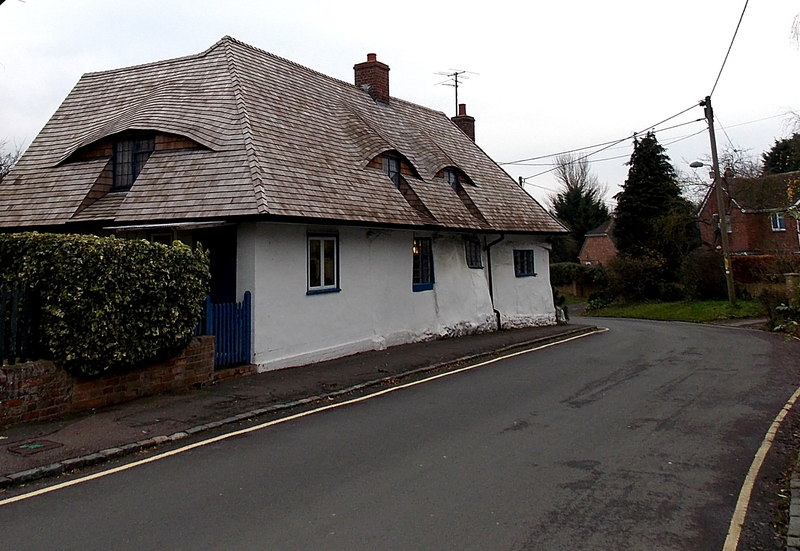
White Cottage, the oldest house in Didcot

Parts of the original village survive in the Lydalls Road area around All Saints' church. In the 16th-century Didcot was a small village of landowners, tenants and tradespeople with a population of about 120. The oldest surviving house in Didcot is White Cottage, a 16th-century timber-framed building in Manor Road that has a wood shingle roof. It is a Grade II listed building. At that time the village centre consisted of a group of cottages and surrounding farms around Manor, Foxhall and Lydalls Roads. Those still surviving include The Nook, Thorney Down Cottage and Manor Cottage, which were all built in the early to mid-17th century. Didcot village was on the route between London and Wantage (now Wantage Road), which in 1752 was made a toll road. Didcot had three toll gates that collected revenue for the turnpike trust until 1879, when the trust was dissolved due to the growing use of the railway.

==== Great Western Railway ====
The Great Western Railway, engineered by Isambard Kingdom Brunel, reached Didcot in 1839. In 1844 the Brunel-designed Didcot station was opened. The original station burnt down in the late 19th century. Although longer, a cheaper-to-build line to Bristol would have been through Abingdon farther north but the landowner, the first Lord Wantage, is reputed to have prevented that alignment. The railway and its junction to Oxford assisted the growth of Didcot. The station's name helped to standardise the spelling "Didcot".

==== Didcot, Newbury and Southampton Railway ====
Didcot's junction of the routes to London, Bristol, Oxford and to Southampton via the Didcot, Newbury and Southampton Railway (DN&S) made the town militarily important, especially during the First World War campaign on the Western Front and the Second World War preparations for D-Day. The DN&S line has since closed, and the large Army and Royal Air Force ordnance depots have disappeared beneath the power station and Milton Park Business Park; however the 11 Explosive Ordnance Disposal and Search Regiment RLC is still based at the Vauxhall Barracks in the town.

Remains of the DN&S railway survive in the eastern part of town. This line, designed to provide a direct link to the south coast from the Midlands and the North avoiding the indirect and congested route via Reading and Basingstoke, was built in 1879–82 after previous proposals had failed. It was designed as a main line and was engineered by John Fowler and built by contractors TH Falkiner and Sir Thomas Tancred, who together also constructed the Forth Railway Bridge. It was a very costly line to build due to the heavy engineering challenges of crossing the Berkshire and Hampshire Downs with a 1 in 106 gradient to allow for higher mainline speeds, and this initial cost and the initially lower than expected traffic volumes caused the company financial problems. It never independently reached Southampton, but instead joined the main London and South Western Railway line at Shawford, south of Winchester.

In the Second World War there was so much military traffic to the port of Southampton that the line was upgraded. The northern section between Didcot and Newbury was made double track. It was closed for 5 months in 1942–43 for this to be done. Several of the bridges in the area of Didcot and the Hagbournes were also strengthened and rebuilt. Although passenger trains between Didcot and Newbury were withdrawn in 1962, the line continued to be used by freight trains for a further four years, and there was regular oil traffic to the north from the refinery at Fawley near Southampton. But in 1966 this traffic was also withdrawn, and then the line was dismantled. The last passenger train was a re-routed Pines Express in May 1964, diverted due to a derailment at Reading West. A section of the abandoned embankment towards Upton, now designated as a Sustrans route, has views across the town and countryside.

=== 21st century ===
As at 2011, Didcot had a population of more than 26,000, and by 2021 the population had grown to more than 31,000. The new town-centre shopping precinct, the Orchard Centre, was opened in August 2005. As part of the Science Vale Enterprise Zone, Didcot is surrounded by one of the largest scientific clusters in the United Kingdom. There are a number of major science and technology campuses nearby, including the Culham Science Centre, Harwell Science and Innovation Campus, and Milton Park. The Diamond Light Source synchrotron, based at the Harwell Campus, is the largest UK-funded scientific facility to be built for more than 30 years.

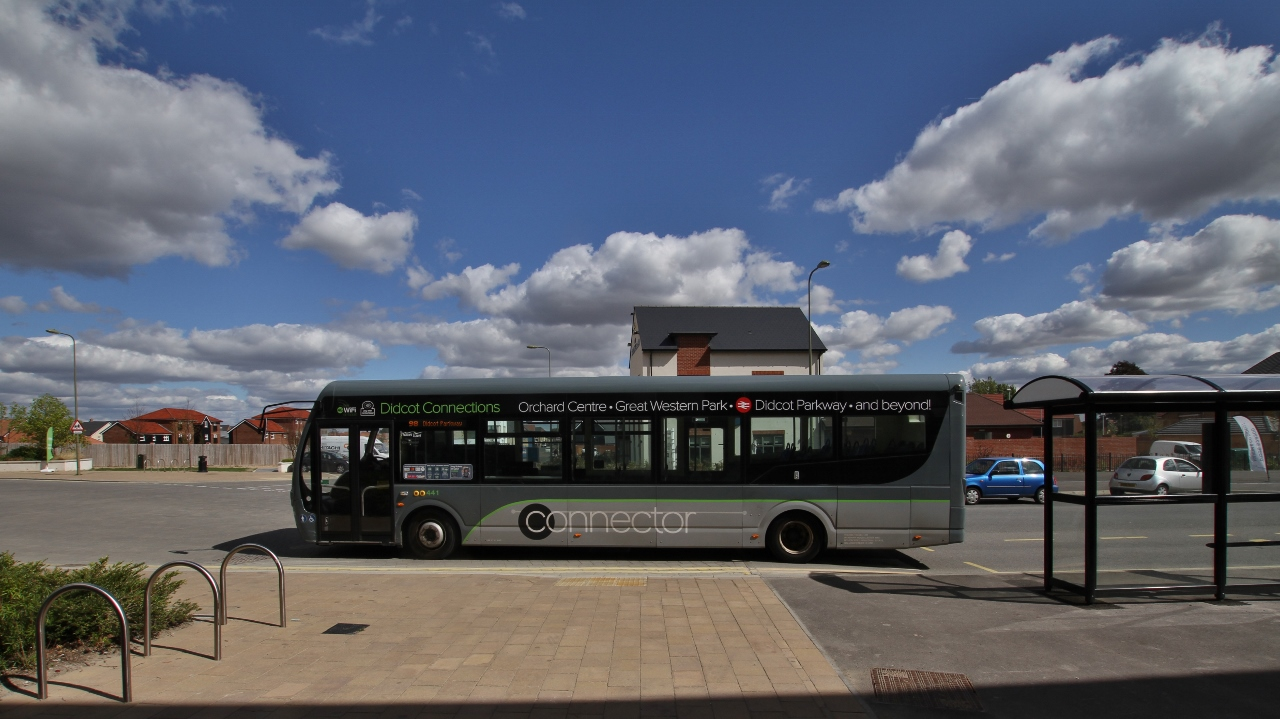
A Thames Travel bus on Greenwood Way in the new Great Western Park estate

Didcot has been designated as one of the three major growth areas in Oxfordshire: the Ladygrove development, to the north and east of the railway line on the former marshland, is set to double the number of homes in the town since construction began in the late 1980s. Originally, the Ladygrove development was planned to be complete by 2001, but the plans for the final section to the east of Abingdon Road were only announced in 2006. Before the Ladygrove development was completed, a prolonged and contentious planning enquiry decided that a 3,300-home development would be built to the west of the town, partly overlapping the boundary with the Vale of White Horse. This is now known as Great Western Park.

In 2008 a new £8 million arts and entertainment centre, Cornerstone, was opened in the Orchard Centre. It has exhibition and studio spaces, a café and a 236-seat auditorium. Designed by Ellis William Architects, the venue is clad with silvered aluminium panels and has a window wall, used to connect the building with passing shoppers. The United Kingdom government named Didcot a garden town in 2015, the first existing town to gain this status, providing funding to support sustainable and environmentally friendly town development over the coming 15 years. In 2017, researchers named Didcot as the most "normal" town in England.

== Railways ==
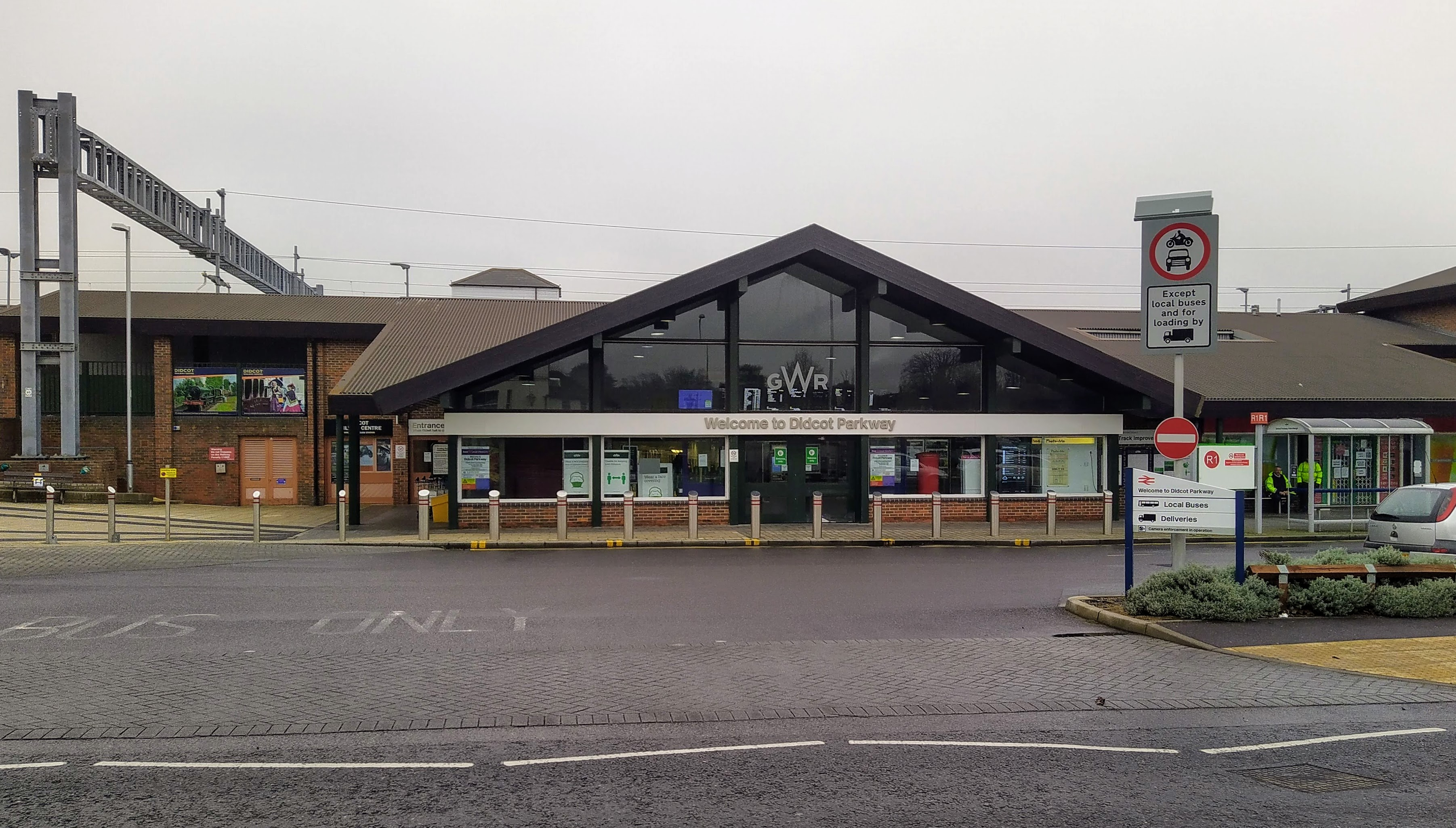
Didcot Parkway in 2020

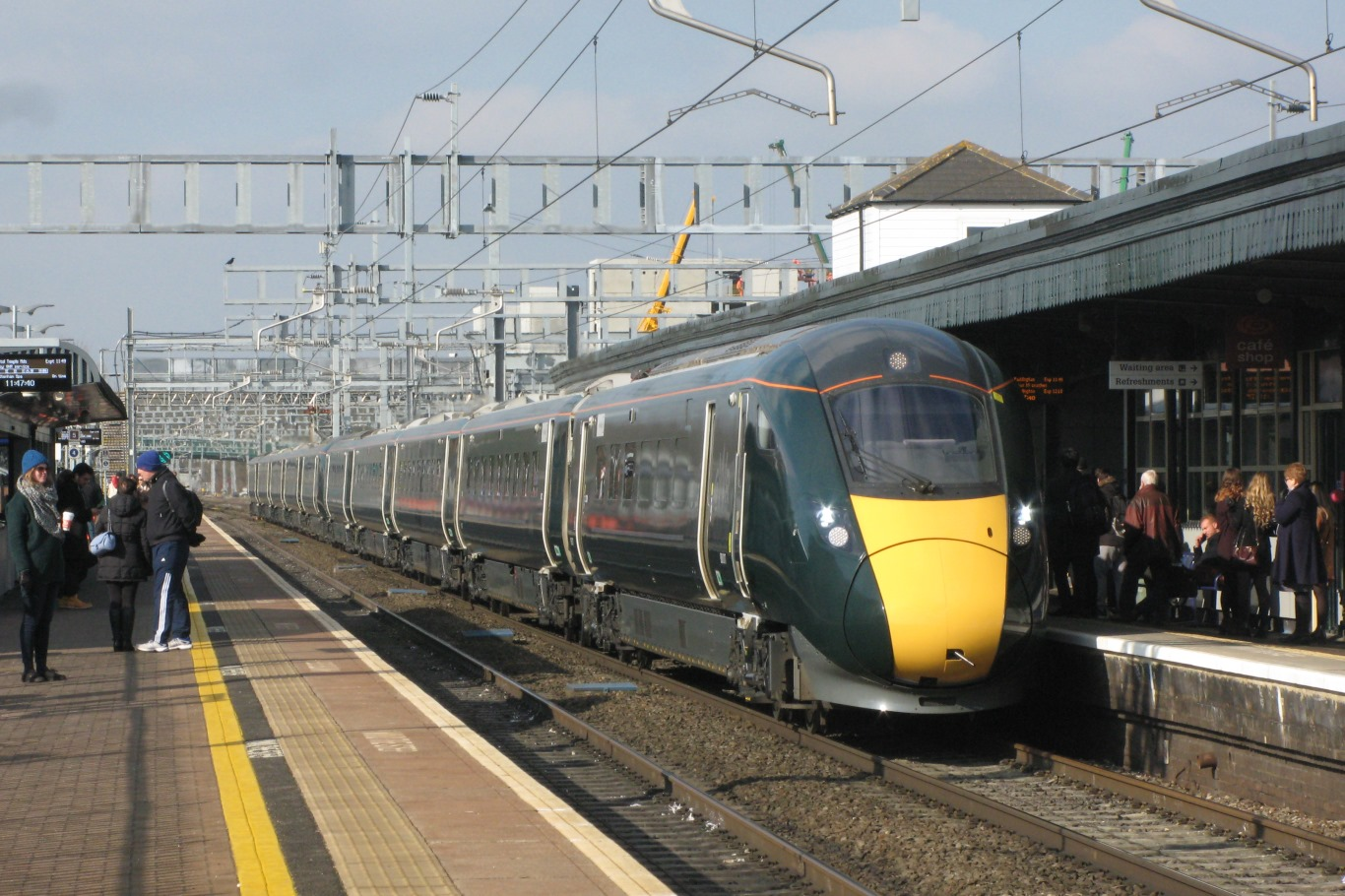
A GWR Class 800 from Swansea arriving on Platform 2

=== Didcot Railway Centre ===
Formed by the Great Western Society in 1967 to house its collection of Great Western Railway locomotives and rolling stock, housed in Didcot's 1932-built Great Western engine shed. The Railway Centre is often used as period film set and has featured in works including Anna Karenina, Sherlock Holmes: A Game of Shadows and The Elephant Man. The centre is north of Didcot Parkway railway station, and is accessed from the station via the pedestrian subway.

=== Didcot Parkway station ===
The station was originally called Didcot but then renamed Didcot Parkway in 1985 by British Rail; the site of the old GWR provender stores, which had been demolished in 1976 (the provender pond was kept to maintain the water table) was made into a large car park to attract passengers from the surrounding area. An improvement programme for the forecourt of the station began in September 2012. This was viewed as being the first phase of better connecting the station to Didcot town centre.

== Economy ==
=== Power stations ===
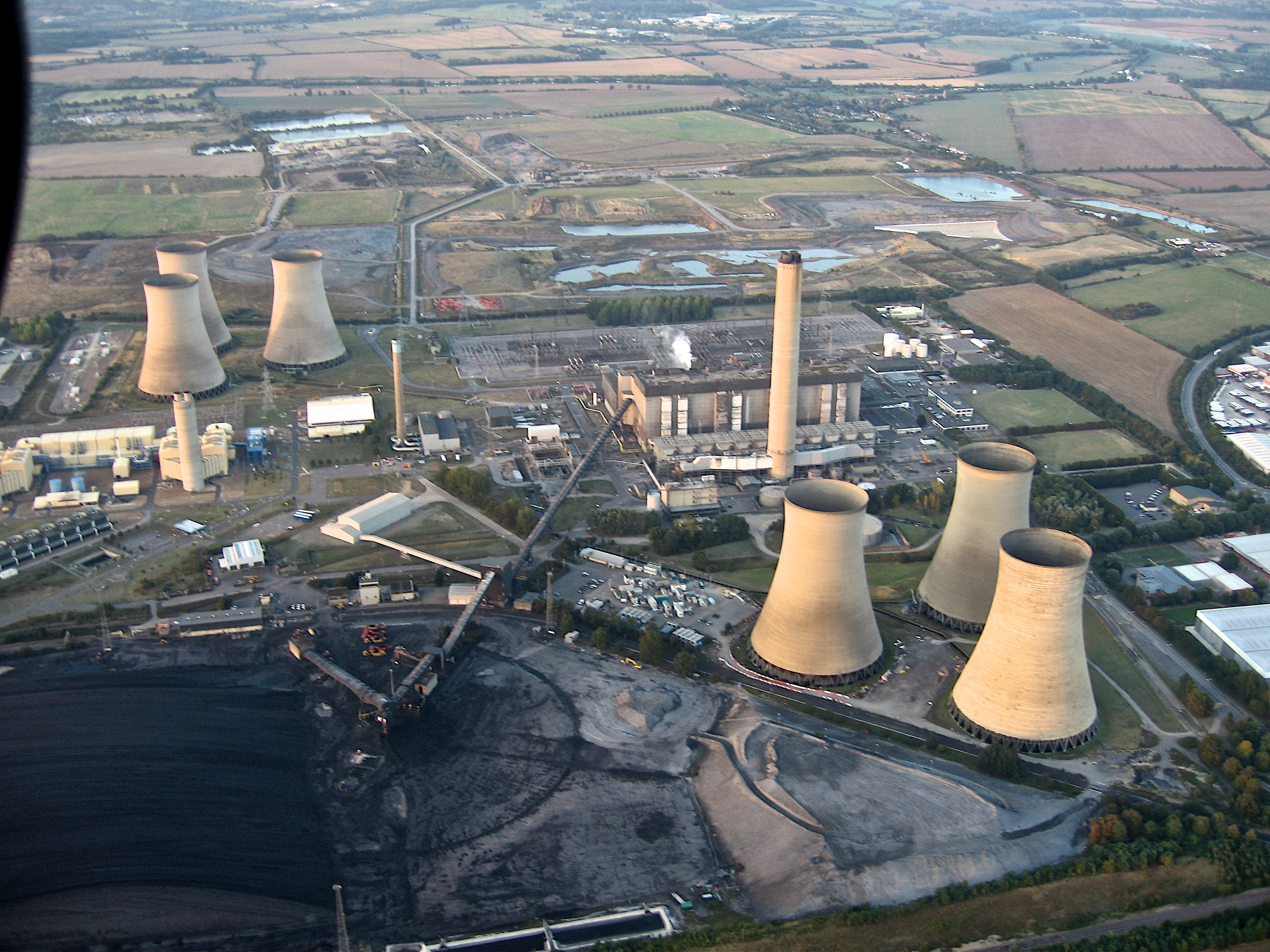
Aerial view of Didcot Power Stations A (centre) and B (extreme left)

Didcot A Power Station (between Didcot and Sutton Courtenay), which was commissioned in 1968, ceased generating electricity for the National Grid in March 2013. Country Life once voted the power station the third worst eyesore in Britain. The power station cooling towers were visible from up to 30 miles (48 km) away because of their location, but were designed with visual impact in mind (six towers in two separated groups 0.5 miles (800 m) apart rather than a monolithic 3×2 block), much in the style of what is sometimes called Didcot's 'sister' station – Fiddlers Ferry Power Station – at Widnes, Cheshire, constructed slightly earlier. The power station had also proved a popular man-made object for local photographers.

In October 2010, Didcot Sewage Works became the first in the UK to produce biomethane gas supplied to the National Grid, for use in up to 200 homes in Oxfordshire. On Sunday 27 July 2014 three of the six 114-metre (374 ft) cooling towers were demolished in the early hours of the morning, using 180 kilograms (400 lb) of explosives. The demolition was streamed live by webcam. On Tuesday 23 February 2016, part of the boiler house building at the power station collapsed; one person was declared dead, five injured and three missing. All were believed to have been preparing the site for demolition. On Sunday 17 July 2016, what remained of the structure was demolished in a controlled explosion. The bodies of the three missing men were still in the remains at that time. A spokesman said that because of the instability of the structure, it had not been possible to recover the three bodies. For safety reasons, robots were used to place the explosive charges, and the site was demolished just after 6am. On Sunday 18 August 2019, the remaining three cooling towers were demolished at 7am.

=== Motor Racing ===
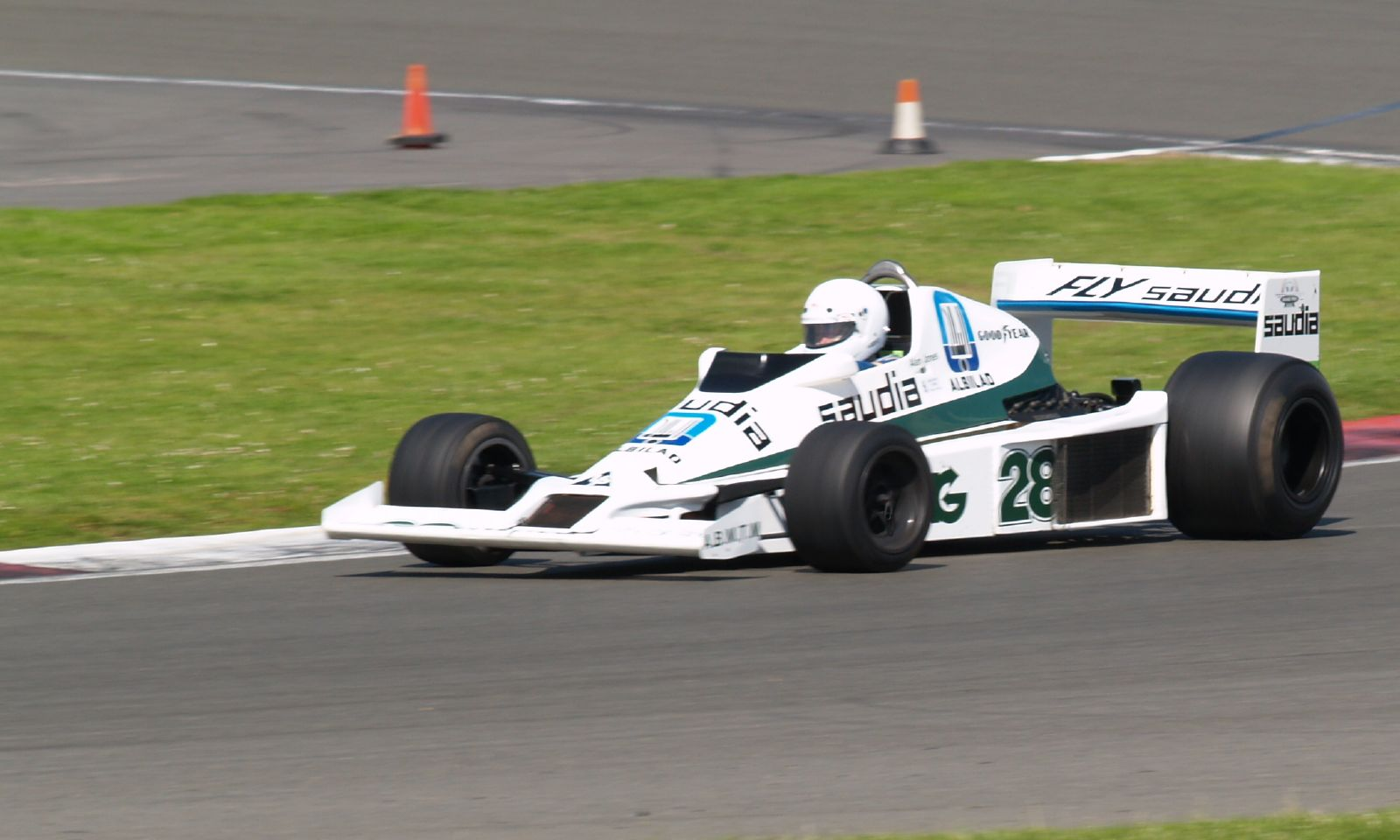
The Didcot-built Williams FW06 from 1978, being raced at Silverstone in 2007

Didcot has a strong connection with motorsports and most notably the Williams Grand Prix Engineering team as Frank Williams founded the team there in a former carpet warehouse on Station Road in 1977. After establishing themselves in Formula One, the factory, now including a small 'Williams Museum', moved within Didcot to a new factory adjacent to the Didcot A Power Station site on Basil Hill Road. They stayed there until 1995 when they finally outgrew the site, moving to the former Jansen Pharmaceutical site in nearby Grove where they are still based today. After Williams Grand Prix Engineering's departure, the site was used for the design and production of the BMW V12 LM and BMW V12 LMR sports prototype racing cars, a joint collaboration between Williams and BMW which would go on to win the 1999 24 Hours of Le Mans. During the 1990s Williams also ran their joint British Touring Car Championship effort with Renault; Williams Touring Car Engineering from a warehouse on Churchward on the Southmead Industrial Estate in Didcot. In 2012 a road through the new Great Western Park development in Didcot was named Sir Frank Williams Avenue in honour of Williams' contribution to the town.

In the late 1960s and 1970s, Rich's Sidings in Didcot was home to Maxperenco, a racing car manufacturer run by Andrew Duncan who produced both Single-Seater Formula cars and GT Sports cars.

During the 1980s and 1990s the Southmead Industrial Estate in Didcot was also home to Nissan Motorsports' Europe headquarters where they raced Nissan Primera touring cars in the British Touring Car Championship. This would go on to become Team RJN who are still based on the Southmead Industrial Estate to this day.

More recently, Didcot is home to a Pirelli distribution and logistics centre which provides tyres for Formula One Grand Prix motor racing events across Europe. In 2015 the head offices of the Bloodhound LSR land speed record attempt team were moved to the new University Technical College (UTC) Oxfordshire site on the boundary between Didcot and Harwell. In 2019 the team relocated to Berkeley Green Technical College in Gloucestershire.

=== Agriculture ===
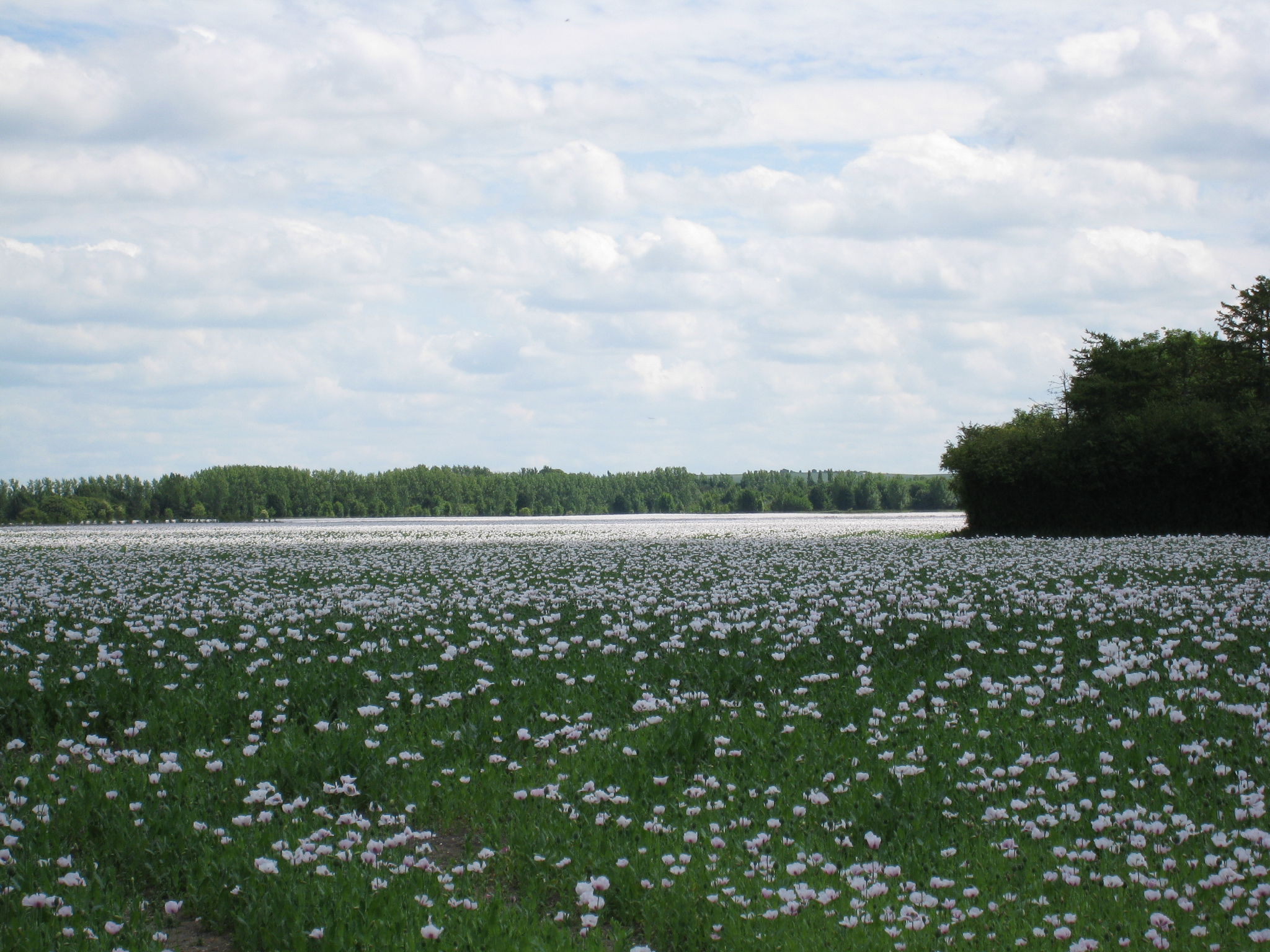
Opium poppies were being cultivated at Harwell in June 2009

Didcot is surrounded by farmland which has historically grown traditional British crops such as wheat and barley, sheep farming is also common in the area. The area is also noted for farmers growing opium poppies for legal production of morphine and heroin to meet National Health Service demand. The poppies produced are sold to Macfarlan Smith, a major pharmaceutical company, who hold a licence from the United Kingdom's Home Office.

Didcot formerly had a dairy bottling factory and chicken farm in the town from 1935 to 1987, initially operated by Job's Dairy and later after 1970, Express Dairy; the site employed a large number of local people. The dairy was located in the Northbourne area of the town, and was later redeveloped into a residential area around Western Avenue, next to the former Didcot, Newbury and Southampton Railway line, now a cycle path.

=== Printing ===
From 2007 until 2017, the Daily Mail & General Trust had a printing plant in Didcot.

== Military ==
The British Army's Vauxhall Barracks is on the edge of town. The regimental headquarters of 11 Explosive Ordnance Disposal and Search Regiment RLC is based in the town.

== Governance ==
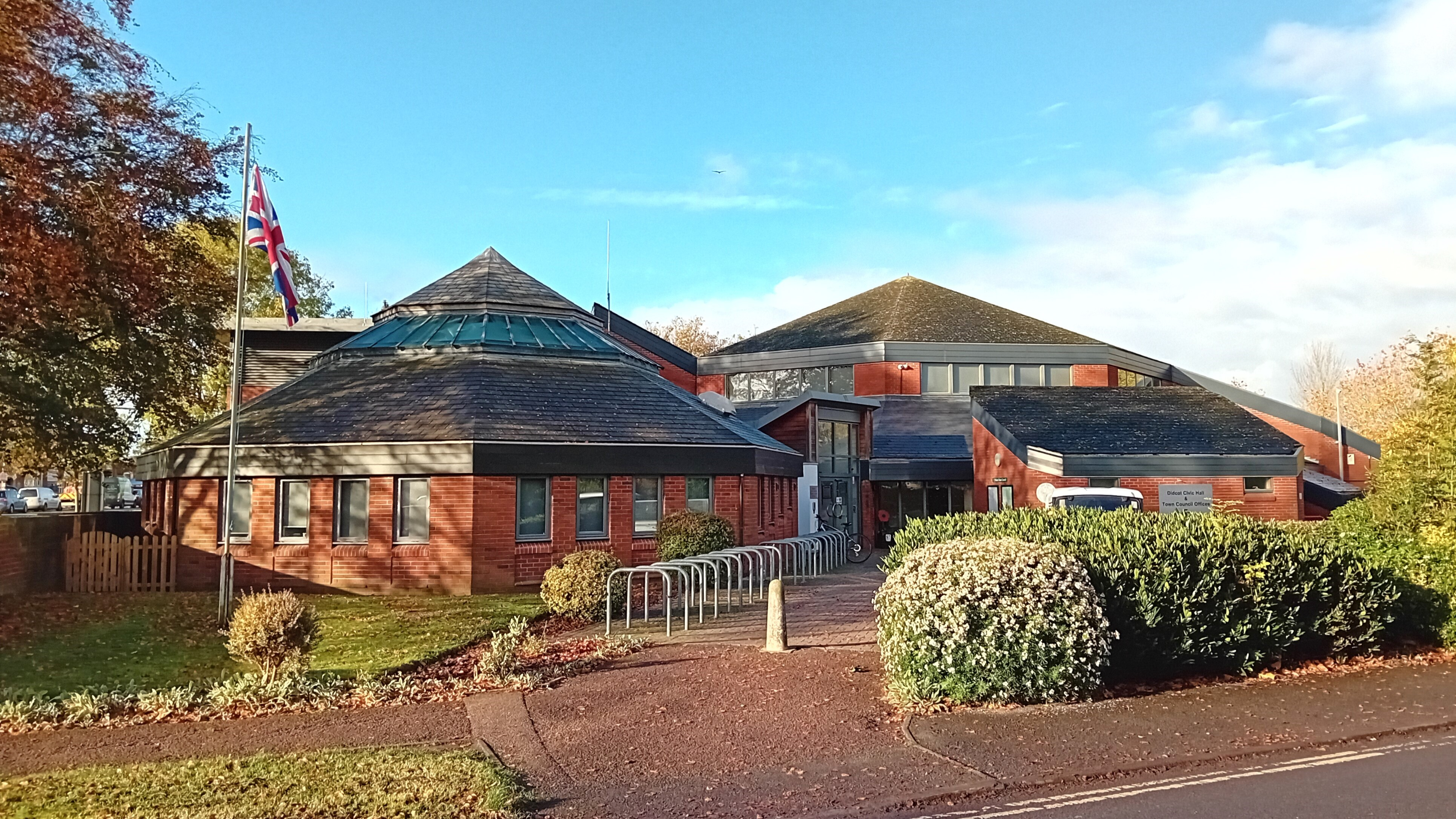
Civic Hall, Didcot

There are three tiers of local government covering Didcot, at parish (town), district and county level: Didcot Town Council, South Oxfordshire District Council and Oxfordshire County Council. The town council has its offices at the Civic Hall on Britwell Road.

The town council comprises 21 councillors representing the five wards in the town:

- All Saints – 5 members
- Ladygrove – 6 members
- Milbrook – 1 member
- Northbourne and Orchard – 4 members
- Park – 5 members

Meetings of the town council are chaired by the mayor. Mayors are elected by the councillors for a one-year term; since 6 May 2025 the mayor has been Councillor Jim Loder (Park ward).

Didcot is also the largest town in the parliamentary constituency of Didcot and Wantage, which has been represented since 2024 at Westminster by Olly Glover, Liberal Democrat.

=== Administrative history ===
Didcot was an ancient parish in Berkshire. When elected parish and district councils were created in 1894, Didcot was given a parish council and included in the Wallingford Rural District. The rural district council moved its offices from Wallingford to Didcot in the 1950s. Wallingford Rural District was abolished in 1974 and the area was transferred to Oxfordshire and the new district of South Oxfordshire, becoming the largest town in the new district. After 1974 parish councils were allowed to declare their parishes to be towns and take the style town council, as Didcot has done. The Civic Hall was built for the town council in 1979 and also serves as a venue for public events.

== Health ==
The district in England with the highest healthy life expectancy, according to an Office for National Statistics (ONS) study, is the 1990s-built Ladygrove Estate in Didcot. While the average UK healthy lifespan was thought to be 68.8 for women and 67 for men in 2001, people in Ladygrove district of Didcot could expect 86 healthy years. It is believed Ladygrove may have benefited from the local recreation grounds and sports centre.

== Education ==
Didcot is served by seven primary schools: All Saints' C of E, Aureus, Ladygrove Park, Manor, Northbourne C of E, Stephen Freeman and Willowcroft. Along with these seven schools based in Didcot, a further six local village schools form the Didcot Primary Partnership: Blewbury Endowed C of E, Cholsey, Hagbourne, Harwell Community, Long Wittenham C of E and South Moreton County. Didcot Primary Academy, opened in 2016 in the Great Western Park area, falls under Harwell Parish.

Two of Didcot's state secondary schools; St Birinus School and Didcot Girls' School are single-sex schools that join at sixth form to host Didcot Sixth Form. There are two other secondary schools in Didcot which have opened alongside the construction of the Great Western Park estate; UTC Oxfordshire (ages 14–19), in 2015, and Aureus School (ages 11–16), in 2017.

== Arts and culture ==
=== Arts centre ===
Cornerstone, a 278-seater multi-purpose arts centre, was opened on 29 August 2008.

=== Choir ===
Didcot Choral Society, founded in 1958, performs three concerts a year in various venues around the town as well as an annual tour (Paris in 2008, Belgium in 2009).

=== Symphony orchestra ===
Didcot Concert Orchestra, founded in 2017, performs concerts every February, May and October at Cornerstone arts centre in Didcot.

=== Film and TV ===
In November 2018, Rebellion Developments began setting up a new studio on the edge of Didcot, valued at $100 million, using the existing former Daily Mail printing works on Milton Road. The studio is planned to be used for film and TV series based on 2000 AD comic series characters, including Judge Dredd: Mega City One.

=== Local media ===
Local news and television programmes are provided by BBC South and ITV Meridian. Television signals are received from the Oxford TV transmitter.

Didcot's local radio stations are BBC Radio Oxford on 95.2 FM, Heart South on 102.6 FM and Greatest Hits Radio on 106.4 FM.

Local newspapers are the Didcot Herald and Oxfordshire Guardian.

== Sport and leisure ==
=== Leisure centres ===
Didcot has three main leisure centres:

- Didcot Leisure Centre
- Didcot Wave Leisure Centre (pool)
- Willowbrook Leisure Centre

=== Parks, gardens and open spaces ===
Didcot Town Council maintains the following:

- Edmonds Park
- Loyd Recreation Park
- Smallbone Recreation Park
- Garden of Remembrance
- Marsh Recreation Ground
- Great Western Drive Park
- Ladygrove Park and Lakes
- Ladygrove woods
- Ladygrove Skate Park
- Mendip Heights Play Area
- The Diamond Jubilee Garden
- Broadway Gardens
- Stubbings Land
- Millennium wood at the Hagbourne Triangle
- Cemetery, Kynaston Road

Didcot also has a nature reserve, Mowbray Fields, where wildlife including common spotted orchid and Southern Marsh Orchid occur.

=== Sport clubs ===
==== Cricket ====
Didcot Cricket Club's current home ground is at Boundary Park in Great Western Park.

==== Cycling ====
Didcot Phoenix cycle club was founded in 1973 and is represented by over 70 members who participate in a range of cycling activities including touring, time trials, road racing, Audax, cyclocross and off-road events.

The OVO Energy Women's Tour, a road cycling event, passed through Didcot on 12 June 2019. The race was halted for around 30 minutes on the Broadway because of a crash that caused the withdrawal of race leader Marianne Vos.

==== Karate ====
The Didcot Karate School teaches traditional Goju-ryu karate for adults and children at the Fleet Meadow Community Hall. The club has been long established in the town and has been listed by the town council as a key local activity.

==== Korfball ====
Didcot Dragons Korfball club was founded in 2003. The club has two teams in the Oxfordshire leagues. They train in Willowbrook Leisure Centre in the winter and Boundary Park in the summer.

==== Football ====
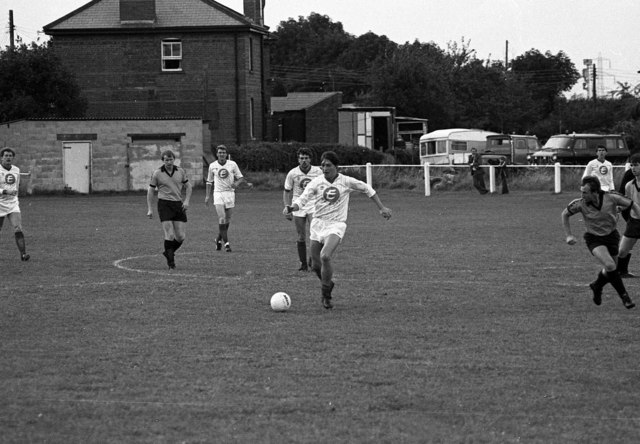
Didcot Town Football Club's Station Road Ground in 1982

Didcot Town Football Club's home ground is the Loop Meadow Stadium on the Ladygrove Estate, having moved from their previous pitch off Station Road in 1999 to make way for the new Orchard Centre development. Founded in 1907, the club currently play in the 8th tier of the English Football League system.

Most notable achievements include winning the FA Vase in 2005 and reaching The FA Cup 1st Round in 2015.

==== Running ====
Didcot has its own chapter of the Hash House Harriers. The club started in 1986 (the first run was on 8 April of that year).

Didcot Runners is an AAA affiliated running club founded in 2003 that meets every Tuesday & Thursday for group runs and fitness sessions. Its members participate in running races across the country.

==== Table tennis ====
The Didcot & District Table Tennis Association (DDTTA) was established in 1949 to promote the playing of table tennis in the Didcot area. It organises an annual league competition containing affiliated teams from towns and villages across south Oxfordshire.

== Notable people ==
- Didcot was the birthplace of William Bradbery, the first person to cultivate watercress commercially in the early 19th century.
- Didcot is the birthplace of former Reading and Oxford United manager Maurice Evans and one of Reading's most-capped football players Jerry Williams.
- Didcot-born rower Ken Lester competed in the 1960 Summer Olympics at the age of 13 in the coxed pairs (as the cox), he remains Britain's youngest ever male Olympian.
- Figurative artist Rodney Gladwell was born in the town in 1928.
- Air Commodore Russell La Forte was born in Didcot in 1960 and was commander of British armed forces in the South Atlantic Islands between 2013 and 2015. He was a member of the Didcot Air Training Corps (Air Cadets) as a child.
- Matt Richardson, a comedian and television presenter known for hosting The Xtra Factor, grew up in Didcot.
- Ed Vaizey has been Lord Vaizey of Didcot since entering the House of Lords in September 2020. From 2005 to 2019, Ed Vaizey was MP for Wantage (which includes Didcot in the constituency).

== In popular culture ==
Didcot's synonymous connection with railways was noted in Douglas Adams and John Lloyd's humorous book the Meaning of Liff, published in 1983. The book, a "dictionary of things that there aren't any words for yet", referred to "a Didcot" as "The small, oddly shaped bit of card which a ticket inspector cuts out of a ticket with his clipper for no apparent reason". Didcot is referred to in Ricky Gervais' comedy feature film David Brent: Life on the Road: the song "Lady Gypsy" on the film's soundtrack tells of a romantic meeting "by the lakeside, just south of Didcot". An electricity pylon on farmland alongside Abingdon Road (opposite Tamar Way) on the eastern edge of Didcot featured on the cover of US rock band Black Swan Lane's album Under My Fallen Sky, released in November 2017.

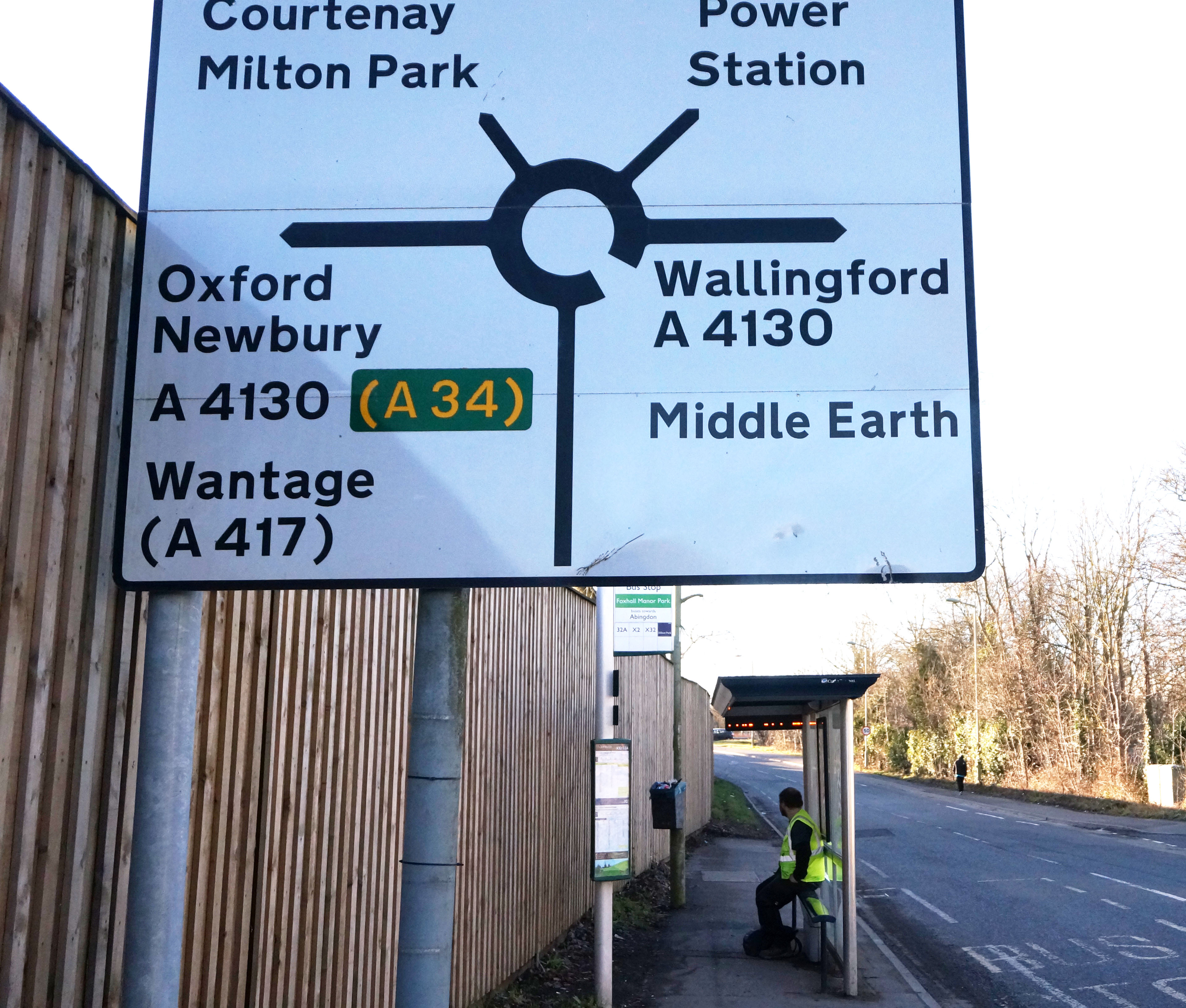
The name Middle Earth was added to this Didcot road sign by anonymous artist Athirty4

In March 2018, anonymous artist Athirty4 added a series of fictional fantasy names to a number of road signs in Didcot. The names included: Narnia, Neverland, Emerald City, Middle Earth, and Gotham City. Oxfordshire County Council thought the signs were an act of vandalism; however, members of the general public felt that the signs brought a lot of positive attention to the town.

== Bibliography ==
- Adams, Douglas; Lloyd, John (1983). The Meaning of Liff. London: Pan Books. p. 39. ISBN 978-0-330-28121-8.
- Ekwall, Eilert (1960) [1936]. Concise Oxford Dictionary of English Place-Names (4th ed.). Oxford: Clarendon Press. Didcot. OCLC 883404886.
- Lingham, Brian (1992). Railway Comes to Didcot: A History of the Town. Vol. 2 – 1839 to 1918. Stroud: Sutton Publishing Ltd. ISBN 978-0-7509-0092-8.
- Lingham, Brian (2014). Didcot Through Time. Gloucester: Amberley Publishing. ISBN 9781445636047.
- Lyons, ET (1972). An Historical Survey of Great Western Engine Sheds: 1837–1947. Oxford Publishing. ISBN 086093019X.
- Sands, TB (1971). The Didcot, Newbury & Southampton Railway. The Oakwood Library of Railway History. Oakwood Press. pp. 6–7. OL28.
- Skeat, Walter W (1911). The Place Names of Berkshire (1 ed.). Oxford: Clarendon Press. p. 26.
- Spalding, Frances (1990). 20th Century Painters and Sculptors. Dictionary of British Art. Vol. 6. Woodbridge: Antique Collectors' Club. p. 207. ISBN 978-1851491063.
- Vincent, James Edmund (1919). Highways and Byways in Berkshire (1 ed.). London: MacMillan & Co. p. 67.
