= Harwell, Oxfordshire =

Village in Oxfordshire, England

Coordinates: 51.597°N 1.293°W

Harwell
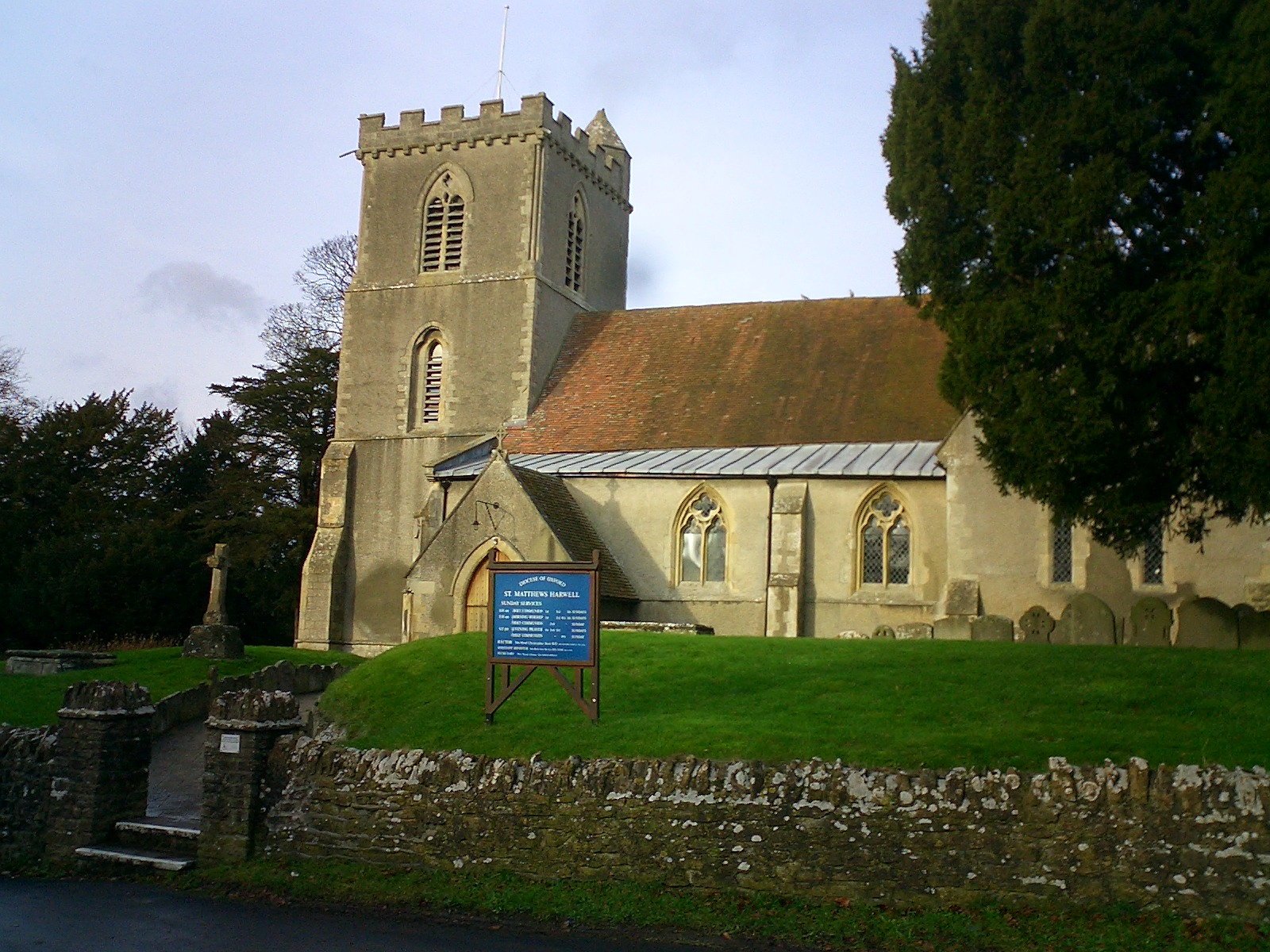
- St. Matthew's parish church

- Location within Oxfordshire
- Population: 2,349 (2011 census)
- OS grid reference: SU4989
- District: Vale of White Horse
- Shire county: Oxfordshire
- Region: South East
- Country: England
- Sovereign state: United Kingdom
- Post town: Didcot
- Postcode district: OX11
- Dialling code: 01235
- Police: Thames Valley
- Fire: Oxfordshire
- Ambulance: South Central
- UK Parliament: Didcot and Wantage
- Website: Harwell Parish Council

Harwell is a village and civil parish in the Vale of White Horse about 2 miles (3 km) west of Didcot, 6 miles (10 km) east of Wantage and 13 miles (21 km) south of Oxford, England. The parish measures about 3.5 miles (6 km) north – south, and almost 2 miles (3 km) east – west at its widest point. In 1923, its area was 2,521 acres (1,020 ha). Historically in Berkshire, it has been administered as part of Oxfordshire since the 1974 boundary changes. The parish includes part of Harwell Science and Innovation Campus in the southwest. The 2011 census recorded the parish's population as 2,349.

== Toponymy ==
The earliest known surviving records of Harwell's name are 10th-century Saxon charters now reproduced in the Cartularium Saxonicum. One from 956 records Horn Down, a nearby hill, as Harandúne, which is derived from the Old English for "grey hill". The same charter records the manor as Haranwylle, which comes from the Old English for "stream by or coming from Horn Hill". A slightly later charter, from 973, records the manor as Harawille. The Domesday Book of 1086 records the manor as Harwelle. Another 11th-century source records it as Harowell. One 13th-century document records it as Arewell. Other 13th- and 14th-century sources record it as Harewell.

== Parish church ==
The Church of England parish church of Saint Matthew may date from the 11th century. In 1962, The Times reported that walling had been found west of the tower indicating where a former nave had been. The herringbone layering of the masonry suggested that an 11th-century date is likely. At the same time a pewter chalice from about 1200 was found. The present nave, east of the tower, was built in about 1200. This second nave has north and south aisles with three-bay arcades. The west tower may have been at the same time, but its Early English Gothic bell openings suggest that it may not have been finished until the middle of the 13th century. The Decorated Gothic chancel is early 14th century and has a five-light east window. The rood screen is probably of the same date, but the screen's Perpendicular Gothic top is later.

The tower has a ring of eight bells. Joseph Carter, who was Master bellfounder at the Whitechapel Bell Foundry and also had a foundry at Reading, cast the fourth bell in 1590 and the seventh bell in 1597. William Yare of Reading cast the third and fifth bells in 1611 and the sixth and tenor bells in 1612. John Taylor & Co of Loughborough cast the treble and second bells in 1932, completing the present ring. St. Matthew's also has a Sanctus bell cast by Robert I Wells of Aldbourne, Wiltshire in the 18th century. There is a single-handed clock on the tower's west face. In 1975, a two-storey extension was built on the north wall which now includes a parish office. A new church hall was built in 1994. St Matthew's parish now shares a rector with the parish of All Saints, Chilton.

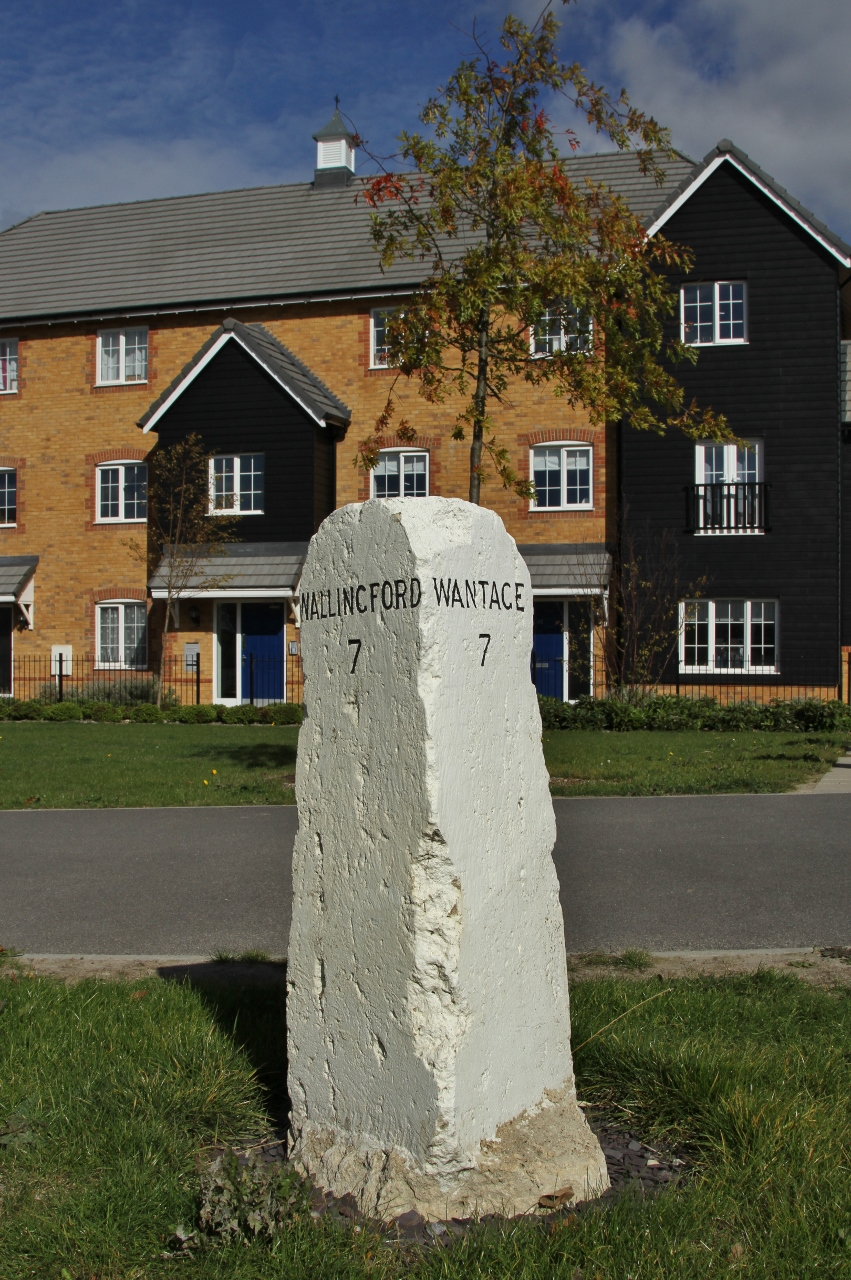
Milestone in Didcot Road at the junction with Greenwood Way

== Economic and social history ==
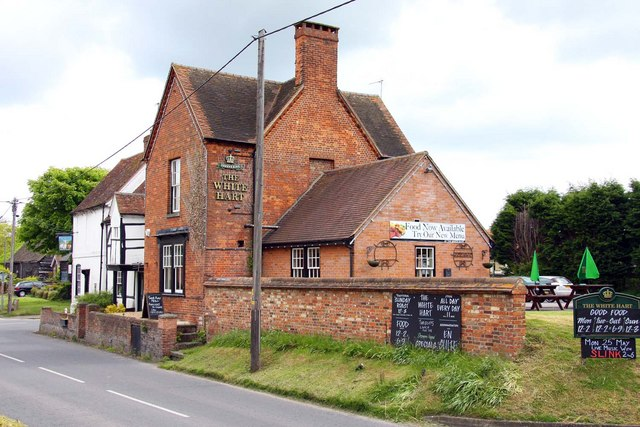
The White Hart

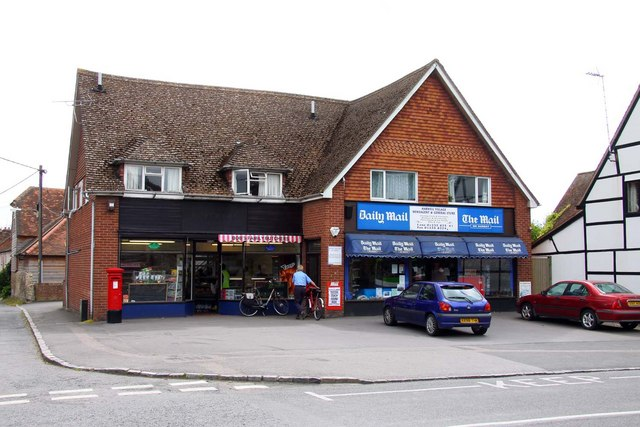
Shops in Harwell

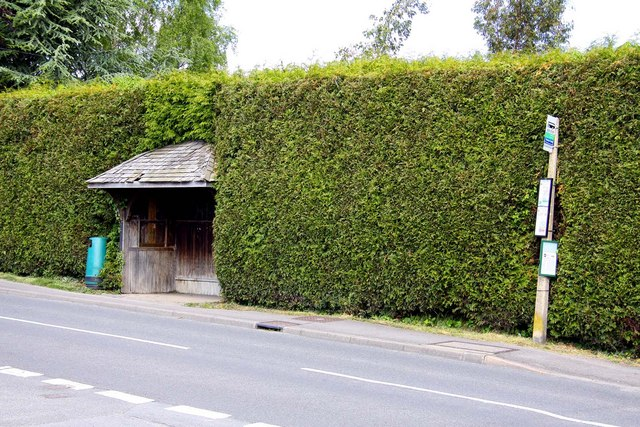
Bus shelter in Wantage Road, Harwell

Harwell contains two 13th-century houses, each of which is a Grade II* listed building. Lime Tree Cottage in the High Street was built about 1250 and remodelled about 1300. A cross-wing was added about 1360 and the house was given a new front about 1700. Gable Cottage and Tibbleton Cottage in Wellshead Lane were originally one timber-framed house, built in about 1295 and extended with a new front range in the 17th century. Bayllols Manor house at Middle Farm is a timber-framed 14th-century hall house, and its service wing may be the remains of a 13th-century building. In 1589, an upper floor was inserted in the 14th-century hall and some pargeting was applied. The farm has two 14th-century barns, each of which is Grade II* listed. One is the Cherry Barn, which was built about 1350 and has 15th- and 17th-century outbuildings. The other was built around 1365 and has a cruck frame.

The White Hart in the High Street is an early 17th-century timber-framed building with early 18th- and mid-19th century brick-built extensions. It now trades as the Hart of Harwell pub and restaurant. Harwell once had five pubs and a brewery. The former brewery is a 17th-century building in the High Street with an 18th-century malt house and 19th-century extension. It is now a private house. The Crown in the High Street was converted into a nursing home, which was run by Southern Cross Healthcare and ceased trading in 2012. The Chequers, The Crispin and The Kicking Donkey have all been converted to private houses. On 4 April 1899, Berkshire Constabulary PC John Charlton was killed in an affray outside the Chequers. His two killers were felled and arrested by another officer, PC Thomas Hewett and later sentenced to 20 years hard labour for manslaughter. Until the Second World War Harwell may have been best known for its cherry orchards.

Geering Almshouses are a row of brick-built almshouses built by a charity established in 1715 but the houses themselves may not have been built until about 1723. The almshouses are a Grade II* listed building. The Great Western Main Line was built through the north of the parish and opened in 1840. Originally the nearest station was Steventon, about 2 miles (3 km) northwest of Harwell, which the Great Western opened in 1840. In 1844, the GWR opened Didcot railway station about 2 1/2 miles (4 km) northeast of Harwell. In 1964, British Railways closed Steventon station, making Didcot (now Didcot Parkway) Harwell's nearest rail link.

The parish boundary has been altered a number of times. On 1 April 2015, the portion north of the railway line, which included part of the Milton Park estate and part of the Didcot Power Station site, was transferred to Sutton Courtenay. In April 2023, the portion east of the A34 road and north of the A417, which included part of the Great Western Park housing development, was split off to create a new parish, Western Valley.

== Airfield and Atomic Energy Research Establishment ==
RAF Harwell was built in 1937. It spans the parish boundaries between Harwell, Chilton and East Hendred. The airfield was used in World War II to launch troop-carrying military gliders for the invasion of Normandy. In 1946, the airfield was taken over to be the new Atomic Energy Research Establishment, the main centre for nuclear power research in the UK, and become Harwell Laboratory. It was the site of Europe's first nuclear reactor in 1946, and once had five nuclear reactors, all of which have been shut down. Two have been completely dismantled, and the other three were planned to be decommissioned by 2022.

Other parts of the airfield were later used by other scientific organisations, including the Science and Technology Facilities Council's Rutherford Appleton Laboratory which runs the ISIS neutron source and hosts the Diamond Light Source synchrotron joint venture. Part of the Atomic Energy Research Establishment is now operated by Research Sites Restoration Limited which is undertaking decommissioning work on behalf of the Nuclear Decommissioning Authority. The former airfield site as a whole is now the Harwell Science and Innovation Campus and is managed by the Australian-based Goodman property group.

== Amenities ==
Harwell's remaining public house, The Hart of Harwell, is at the junction of the High Street and Burr Street. The village has two shops: a butcher and a combined newsagent and off licence. The village has clubs and societies including The Harwellian Club, a Scout troop, a tennis club, a horticultural society, Harwell Feast Committee, Harwell Rugby Club, football clubs, and others. Harwell Feast is a celebration held on the Monday of the Late May Bank Holiday each year. The celebrations include a parade of decorated floats and people through the village. The recreation ground hosts fund-raising stalls and displays including sheepdog handling and historic cars. Either a cow or two pigs are roasted for the feast.

=== Buses ===
Several Thames Travel bus routes serve Harwell. Route 23 links the Great Western Park housing estate with Henley-on-Thames via Milton Park, Didcot and Wallingford, on Mondays to Fridays only. Route 98 links Harwell village and campus with Didcot via the Great Western Park housing estate. Route 99 links Great Western Park with the Milton Park business estate from Mondays to Fridays. It has no Saturday or Sunday service. Route X32 links Harwell village and campus with Didcot, Milton Park, and Oxford daily, and from Mondays to Saturdays also serves Wantage. Route 34 is a limited service between Wantage, Harwell campus and Oxford that runs from Mondays to Fridays only.

== Notable residents ==
- Humphry Bowen (1929–2001), chemist and botanist
- Christopher Elderfield (1607–52), Caroline Divine and author
- Klaus Fuchs (1911–88), nuclear scientist and Soviet spy
- Eric Stanley Greenwood (1906–79), test pilot, first man ever to exceed 600 mph (970 km/h) in level flight
- John Harewell, Bishop of Bath and Wells 1366–86

== Bibliography ==
- Brown, PDC (1967). "The Anglo-Saxon Cemetery at Harwell, Grave 7". Oxoniensia. XXXII. Oxford: Oxford Architectural and Historical Society: 73.
- Ekwall, Eilert (1960) [1936]. Concise Oxford Dictionary of English Place-Names (4th ed.). Oxford: Oxford University Press. Harwell. ISBN 0198691033.
- Fletcher, Anthony; Whiteley, Alfred (1967). Elizabethan Village. Then & There. White Plains: Longman. ISBN 0-582-20409-7.
- Fletcher, J (1968). "Crucks in the West Berkshire and Oxford Region". Oxoniensia. XXXIII. Oxford: Oxford Architectural and Historical Society: 71–88.
- Fletcher, JM (1965). "Three Medieval Farmhouses in Harwell". Berkshire Archaeological Journal. 62. Berkshire Archaeological Society: 45–69.
- Hance, Nick J (2006). Harwell: from Romans and Runways to Reactors and Research Renaissance. Oxford: Enhance Publishing. ISBN 0-9553055-0-0.
- Jones, Derry W (5 September 2008). "Book review: "Harwell: from Romans and Runways to Reactors and Research Renaissance"". International Union of Crystallography Newsletter. 16 (2). International Union of Crystallography.
- Kirk, Joan R; Marshall, Kenneth (1956). "A Saxon Cemetery Near the Village of Harwell, Berkshire". Oxoniensia. XXI. Oxford: Oxford Architectural and Historical Society: 22–34.
- Long, Roger (1990). Murder in Berkshire, A Collection of Sudden Deaths in the Old County. Buckingham: Barracuda Books Ltd.
- Page, William; Ditchfield, PH, eds. (1923). "Harwell". A History of the County of Berkshire. Victoria County History. Vol. III. assisted by John Hautenville Cope. London: The St Katherine Press. pp. 484–492.
- Pevsner, Nikolaus (1966). Berkshire. The Buildings of England. Harmondsworth: Penguin Books. pp. 152–153.
