= List of schools in Oxfordshire =

This is a list of schools in Oxfordshire, England.

== State-funded schools ==
=== Primary schools ===
- Abbey Woods Academy, Berinsfield
- All Saints CE Primary School, Didcot
- Appleton CE Primary School, Appleton
- Ashbury with Compton Beauchamp CE Primary School, Ashbury
- Aston and Cote CE Primary School, Aston
- Aston Rowant CE Primary School, Aston Rowant
- Aureus Primary School, Didcot
- Badgemore Primary School, Henley-on-Thames
- Bampton CE Primary School, Bampton
- Barley Hill Primary School, Thame
- Barton Park Primary School, Oxford
- The Batt CE Primary School, Witney
- Bayard's Hill School, Headington
- Beckley CE Primary School, Beckley
- Benson CE Primary School, Benson
- Bishop Carpenter CE Primary School, North Newington
- Bishop Loveday CE Primary School, Bodicote
- Bladon CE Primary School, Bladon
- The Blake CE Primary School, Cogges
- Bletchingdon Parochial CE Primary School, Bletchingdon
- Blewbury CE Primary School, Blewbury
- Bloxham CE Primary School, Bloxham
- Botley School, Botley
- Brightwell-cum-Sotwell CE Primary School, Brightwell-cum-Sotwell
- Brize Norton Primary School, Brize Norton
- Brookside Primary School, Bicester
- Bruern Abbey School, Chesterton
- Buckland CE Primary School, Buckland
- Bure Park Primary School, Bicester
- Burford Primary School, Burford
- Caldecott Primary School, Abingdon-on-Thames
- Carswell Community Primary School, Abingdon-on-Thames
- Carterton Primary School, Carterton
- Chadlington CE Primary School, Chadlington
- Chalgrove Community Primary School, Chalgrove
- Charlbury Primary School, Charlbury
- Charlton Primary School, Wantage
- Charlton-on-Otmoor CE Primary School, Charlton-on-Otmoor
- Checkendon CE Primary School, Checkendon
- Cherry Fields Primary School, Banbury
- Chesterton CE Primary School, Chesterton
- Chilton County Primary School, Chilton
- Cholsey Primary School, Cholsey
- Christopher Rawlins CE Primary School, Adderbury
- Church Cowley St James CE Primary School, Cowley
- Clanfield CE Primary School, Clanfield
- Clifton Hampden CE Primary School, Clifton Hampden
- Combe CE Primary School, Combe
- Cropredy CE Primary School, Cropredy
- Crowmarsh Gifford CE School, Crowmarsh Gifford
- Cumnor CE School, Cumnor
- Cutteslowe Primary School, Cutteslowe
- Dashwood Banbury Academy, Banbury
- Deddington CE Primary School, Deddington
- Didcot Primary Academy, Didcot
- Dorchester St Birinus CE School, Dorchester on Thames
- Dr Radcliffe's CE Primary School, Steeple Aston
- Dr South's CE Primary School, Islip
- Drayton Community Primary School, Drayton
- Dry Sandford Primary School, Dry Sandford
- Ducklington Primary School, Ducklington
- Dunmore Primary School, Abingdon-on-Thames
- East Oxford Primary School, Cowley
- Edith Moorhouse Primary School, Carterton
- Edward Feild Primary School, Kidlington
- The Elms Primary School, Faringdon
- Enstone Primary School, Enstone
- Europa School UK, Culham
- Ewelme CE Primary School, Ewelme
- Eynsham Community Primary School, Eynsham
- Finmere CE Primary School, Finmere
- Finstock CE Primary School, Finstock
- Fir Tree Junior School, Wallingford
- Five Acres Primary School, Ambrosden
- Folly View Primary School, Faringdon
- Freeland CE Primary School, Freeland
- Fringford CE Primary School, Fringford
- Fritwell CE Primary School, Fritwell
- Gagle Brook Primary School, Bicester
- Garsington CE Primary School, Garsington
- Gateway Primary School, Carterton
- Glory Farm Primary School, Bicester
- Goring CE Primary School, Goring-on-Thames
- The Grange Community Primary School, Banbury
- Graven Hill Primary School, Ambrosden
- Great Milton CE Primary School, Great Milton
- Great Rollright CE Primary School, Great Rollright
- Great Tew County Primary School, Great Tew
- Grove CE School, Grove
- Hagbourne CE Primary School, East Hagbourne
- Hailey CE Primary School, Hailey
- Hanborough Manor CE School, Long Hanborough
- Hanwell Fields Community School, Banbury
- Hardwick Primary School, Banbury
- Harriers Banbury Academy, Banbury
- Harwell Primary School, Harwell
- The Hendreds CE School, East Hendred
- Heyford Park School, Upper Heyford
- Hill View Primary School, Banbury
- Holy Trinity RC School, Chipping Norton
- Hook Norton CE Primary School, Hook Norton
- Hornton Primary School, Hornton
- Horspath CE Primary School, Horspath
- John Blandy Primary School, Southmoor
- John Hampden Primary School, Thame
- John Henry Newman Academy, Littlemore
- Kidmore End CE Primary School, Kidmore End
- Kingham Primary School, Kingham
- King's Meadow Primary School, Bicester
- Kirtlington CE Primary School, Kirtlington
- Ladygrove Park Primary School, Didcot
- Langford Village Community Primary School, Bicester
- Larkrise Primary School, Oxford
- Launton CE Primary School, Launton
- Leafield CE Primary School, Leafield
- Lewknor CE Primary School, Lewknor
- Little Milton CE Primary School, Little Milton
- Long Furlong Primary School, Abingdon-on-Thames
- Long Wittenham CE Primary School, Long Wittenham
- Longcot and Fernham CE Primary School, Longcot
- Longfields Primary and Nursery School, Bicester
- Longford Park Primary School, Bodicote
- Longworth Primary School, Longworth
- Madley Brook Community Primary School, Witney
- Manor Primary School, Didcot
- Marcham CE Primary School, Marcham
- Marsh Baldon CE Primary School, Marsh Baldon
- Middle Barton Primary School, Middle Barton
- Mill Lane Community Primary School, Chinnor
- Millbrook Primary School, Grove
- Nettlebed Community School, Nettlebed
- New Hinksey CE Primary School, New Hinksey, Oxford
- New Marston Primary School, Headington
- North Hinksey CE Primary School, North Hinksey
- North Kidlington Primary School, Kidlington
- North Leigh CE School, North Leigh
- Northbourne CE Primary School, Didcot
- Orchard Fields Community School, Banbury
- Orchard Meadow Primary School, Oxford
- Our Lady of Lourdes RC Primary School, Witney
- Our Lady's RC Primary School, Cowley
- Pegasus School, Blackbird Leys
- Peppard CE Primary School, Rotherfield Peppard
- Queen Emma's Primary School, Witney
- Queensway School, Banbury
- Radley CE Primary School, Radley
- RAF Benson Community Primary School, Benson
- The Ridgeway CE Primary School, Childrey
- Rose Hill Primary School, Rose Hill
- Rush Common School, Abingdon-on-Thames
- Sacred Heart RC Primary School, Henley-on-Thames
- St Aloysius' RC Primary School, Oxford
- St Amand's RC Primary School, East Hendred
- St Andrew's CE Primary School, Chinnor
- St Andrew's CE Primary School, Headington
- St Barnabas' CE Primary School, Oxford
- St Blaise CE Primary School, Abingdon-on-Thames
- St Christopher's CE School, Cowley
- St Christopher's CE School, Langford
- St Ebbe's CE Primary School, Oxford
- St Edburg's CE School, Bicester
- St Edmund's RC Primary School, Abingdon-on-Thames
- St Francis Church of England Primary School, Cowley
- St Frideswide CE Primary School, Oxford
- St James CE Primary School, East Hanney
- St John Fisher RC Primary School, Littlemore
- St John the Evangelist CE Primary School, Carterton
- St John's CE Academy, Grove
- St John's Primary School, Wallingford
- St John's RC Primary School, Banbury
- St Joseph's RC Primary School, Banbury
- St Joseph's RC Primary School, Carterton
- St Joseph's RC Primary School, Headington
- St Joseph's RC Primary School, Thame
- St Kenelm's CE School, Minster Lovell
- St Laurence CE School, Warborough
- St Leonard's CE Primary School, Banbury
- St Mary and John CE Primary School, Oxford
- St Mary's CE Infant School, Witney
- St Mary's CE Primary School, Banbury
- St Mary's CE Primary School, Chipping Norton
- St Mary's RC Primary School, Bicester
- St Michael's CE Primary School, Marston
- St Michael's CE Primary School, Steventon
- St Nicholas CE Primary School, Abingdon-on-Thames
- St Nicholas CE Primary School, East Challow
- St Nicholas' CE Infants' School, Wallingford
- St Nicholas' Primary School, Oxford
- St Peter's CE Primary School, Cassington
- St Peter's CE School, Alvescot
- St Philip and James' CE Primary School, Oxford
- St Swithun's CE Primary School, Kennington
- St Thomas More RC Primary School, Kidlington
- Sandhills Community Primary School, Sandhills
- Shellingford CE School, Shellingford
- Shenington CE Primary School, Shenington
- Shiplake CE School, Shiplake
- Shrivenham CE School, Shrivenham
- Sibford Gower Endowed Primary School, Sibford Gower
- Sires Hill Primary Academy, Didcot
- Sonning Common Primary School, Sonning Common
- South Moreton Primary School, South Moreton
- South Stoke Primary School, South Stoke
- Southwold Primary School, Bicester
- Stadhampton Primary School, Stadhampton
- Standlake CE Primary School, Standlake
- Stanford in the Vale CE Primary School, Stanford in the Vale
- Stanton Harcourt CE Primary School, Stanton Harcourt
- Stephen Freeman Community Primary School, Didcot
- Stockham Primary School, Wantage
- Stoke Row CE Primary School, Stoke Row
- Stonesfield Primary School, Stonesfield
- Sunningwell CE Primary School, Sunningwell
- Sutton Courtenay CE Primary School, Sutton Courtenay
- Tackley CE Primary School, Tackley
- Tetsworth Primary School, Tetsworth
- Thameside Primary School, Abingdon-on-Thames
- Thomas Reade Primary School, Abingdon-on-Thames
- Tower Hill Community Primary School, Witney
- Trinity CE Primary School, Henley-on-Thames
- Tyndale Community School, Cowley
- Uffington CE Primary School, Uffington
- Valley Road School, Henley-on-Thames
- Wantage CE Primary School, Wantage
- Wantage Primary Academy, Wantage
- Watchfield Primary School, Watchfield
- Watlington Primary School, Watlington
- West Kidlington Primary School, Kidlington
- West Oxford Community Primary School, Oxford
- West Witney Primary School, Witney
- Wheatley Church of England Primary School, Wheatley
- Whitchurch Primary School, Whitchurch-on-Thames
- William Fletcher Primary School, Yarnton
- William Morris Primary School, Banbury
- Willowcroft Community School, Didcot
- Windale Primary School, Oxford
- Windmill Primary School, Headington
- Windrush CE Primary School, Witney
- Witney Community Primary School, Witney
- Wolvercote Primary School, Wolvercote
- Wood Farm Primary School, Headington
- Woodcote Primary School, Woodcote
- Woodstock CE Primary School, Woodstock
- Wootton St Peter's CE Primary School, Wootton
- Wroxton CE Primary School, Wroxton
- Wychwood CE Primary School, Shipton-under-Wychwood

=== Secondary schools ===
- Aureus School, Didcot
- Bartholomew School, Eynsham
- The Bicester School, Bicester
- Blessed George Napier Roman Catholic School, Banbury
- Burford School, Burford
- Carterton Community College, Carterton
- Cheney School, Headington
- Cherwell School, Oxford
- Chipping Norton School, Chipping Norton
- The Cooper School, Bicester
- Didcot Girls' School, Didcot
- Europa School UK, Culham
- Faringdon Community College, Faringdon
- Fitzharrys School, Abingdon-on-Thames
- Futures Institute, Banbury
- Gillotts School, Henley-on-Thames
- Gosford Hill School, Kidlington
- Greyfriars Catholic School, Oxford
- Henry Box School, Witney
- Heyford Park School, Upper Heyford
- Icknield Community College, Watlington
- John Mason School, Abingdon-on-Thames
- King Alfred's Academy, Wantage
- Langtree School, Woodcote
- Larkmead School, Abingdon-on-Thames
- Lord Williams's School, Thame
- Maiden Erlegh Chiltern Edge, Sonning Common
- Marlborough School, Woodstock
- Matthew Arnold School, Oxford
- North Oxfordshire Academy, Banbury
- Oxford Academy, Littlemore
- Oxford Spires Academy, Oxford
- St Birinus School, Didcot
- St John's CE Academy, Grove
- The Swan School, Oxford
- UTC Oxfordshire, Didcot
- Wallingford School, Wallingford
- The Warriner School, Bloxham
- Wheatley Park School, Holton
- Whitelands Academy, Bicester
- Wood Green School, Witney
- Wykham Park Academy, Banbury

=== Special and alternative schools ===
- Bardwell School, Bicester
- Bishopswood School, Sonning Common
- Endeavour Academy, Headington
- Fitzwaryn School, Wantage
- Frank Wise School, Banbury
- The Iffley Academy, Oxford
- John Watson School, Wheatley
- Kingfisher School, Abingdon-on-Thames
- Mabel Prichard School, Oxford
- Meadowbrook College, Old Marston
- Northern House Academy, Oxford
- Orion Academy, Blackbird Leys
- Oxfordshire Hospital School, Old Marston
- Springfield School, Madley Park
- Woodeaton Manor School, Woodeaton

=== Further education ===
- Abingdon and Witney College
- Banbury and Bicester College
- City of Oxford College
- Henley College

== Independent schools ==
=== Primary and preparatory schools ===
- Abingdon Preparatory School, Frilford
- Bruern Abbey School, Chesterton
- Chandlings, Bagley Wood
- Christ Church Cathedral School, Oxford
- Cothill House, Kennington
- Dragon School, Oxford
- Emmanuel Christian School, Littlemore
- Kitebrook Preparatory School, Chastleton
- The Manor Preparatory School, Shippon
- Moulsford Preparatory School, Moulsford
- New College School, Oxford
- The Oratory Preparatory School, Goring Heath
- Pinewood School, Bourton
- Rupert House School, Henley-on-Thames
- St Hugh's School, Faringdon
- St John's Priory School, Banbury
- St Mary's Preparatory School, Henley-on-Thames
- Summer Fields School, Oxford
- The Treehouse School, Cholsey
- Windrush Valley School, Ascott-under-Wychwood

=== Senior and all-through schools ===
- Abingdon School, Abingdon-on-Thames
- Bloxham School, Bloxham
- Carfax College, Oxford
- Cherwell College, Oxford
- Cokethorpe School, Witney
- Cranford House School, Wallingford
- D'Overbroeck's College, Oxford
- Headington School, Oxford
- Kingham Hill School, Chipping Norton
- Kings Oxford, Oxford
- King's School, Witney
- Magdalen College School, Oxford
- The Oratory School, Woodcote
- Our Lady's Abingdon, Abingdon (closed 2025)
- Oxford High School, Oxford
- Oxford International College, Oxford
- Oxford Montessori Schools, Elsfield
- Oxford Sixth Form College, Oxford
- Radley College, Radley
- Rye St Antony School, Oxford
- St Clare's, Oxford
- St Edward's School, Oxford
- St Helen and St Katharine, Abingdon-on-Thames
- Shiplake College, Shiplake
- Sibford School, Sibford Ferris
- Tudor Hall School, Banbury
- Wychwood School, Oxford

=== Special and alternative schools ===
- Chilworth House School, Wheatley
- Chilworth House Upper School, Oxford
- Huckleberry Therapeutic School, Wantage
- Include Oxfordshire, Oxford
- LVS Oxford, Begbroke
- Mulberry Bush School, Standlake
- Park School, Chipping Norton
- Sandwell Learning Centre, Alvescot
- Swalcliffe Park School, Swalcliffe
- The Unicorn School, Abingdon-on-Thames

=== Further education ===
- EF Academy, Oxford
- Greene's Tutorial College, Oxford
