= Bulmershe =

Bulmershe may refer to:

- Bulmershe College
- Bulmershe Court
- The Bulmershe School

== See also ==
- University of Reading
