= Dave Arch =

British arranger and composer

- Born: David Arch; 25 October 1962 (age 63); Henley-on-Thames, Oxfordshire, U.K.
- Education: Guildhall School of Music and Drama
- Occupations: Conductor; composer; director of music
- Known for: Strictly Come Dancing
- Father: Gwyn Arch
- Website: dave-arch.com

David Arch (born 25 October 1962, in Henley-on-Thames), better known as Dave Arch, is a British pianist, conductor, arranger and composer with a career covering albums, films and commercials, television and live performances. Since 2006, he has been musical director and arranger for BBC Television's Strictly Come Dancing.

== Early life ==
Arch's father was Gwyn Arch, a composer and choral director. David Arch was born on 25 October 1962, in Henley-on-Thames and grew up in nearby Sonning Common, South Oxfordshire. He attended Chiltern Edge School and King James College, Henley-on-Thames, and the Guildhall School of Music and Drama. He was a member of the National Youth Jazz Orchestra.

== Career ==
=== Television career ===
Arch is best known for his role as musical director and arranger for BBC Television's Strictly Come Dancing, joining in 2006 after working as musical director on two series of Strictly Dance Fever, and Just the Two of Us. He was musical director for productions of the Royal Variety Performance for ITV, including in 2021, the hundredth anniversary at the Royal Albert Hall, and for ITV's series Stepping Out and Popstar to Operastar.

In 2013, Arch was musical director and band leader for the television special When Miranda Met Bruce.

=== Compositions ===
Arch was commissioned to produce the original themes and stings for the British television broadcaster GMTV, broadcast between 1993 and 2010. Subsequent themes were all based on his original melody.

In 1986, Arch recorded a series of albums on red vinyl for UK-based Cavendish Music Library, which also featured Ray Russell on guitar. In 2005 Arch played keyboards for the Greg Lake Band.

In October 2016, Arch released his debut album Coming Home, consisting of his own compositions and including collaborations with his son, his father and "Strictly" colleague singer Tommy Blaize. The album was recorded and co-produced by Haydn Bendall at Abbey Road, Air, Rak and Strongroom studios.

== Personal life ==
Arch has two children.
