= Checkendon Polish Resettlement Hostel =

The Checkendon Polish Resttlement Hostel was a former camp for displaced people exiled from Poland after the Second World War, once situated near Checkendon village and civil parish about 6 miles (10 km) west of Henley-on-Thames in South Oxfordshire and about 9 miles (14 km) north west of Reading in Berkshire in the Chilterns.

== Checkendon Military History 1940-1945 ==
The first Polish military connection with Checkendon was Polish Air Force Pilot Officer Jerzy de Jenko-Sokołowski who was killed in a flying accident on 1 October 1940. His aircraft, a Fairey Battle, flying from nearby RAF Benson crashed into woodland at Heath End near Checkendon.

Although there was much activity of the Checkendon and Stoke Row Home Guard, up to 1942 Checkendon's Scots Common was woodland managed by the Reede estate of Ipsden. In WW2 the land on Scots Common was taken over by the military and in 1943 American troops destined for D Day Normandy beaches were housed in Nissen huts, the camp later became United States Army 306th Station hospital and even a Prisoner of War camp. Checkendon became part of RAF Woodcote where 70MU (Maintenance Unit) was based.

== Checkendon 1946-1948 and the Polish Resettlement Corps (Polish: Polski Korpus Przysposobienia i Rozmieszczenia) ==
In June 1946, immediately after World War II Checkendon and the nearby parish of Ipsden hosted at Checkendon military camp on Scots Common exiled allied Polish troops primarily from Polish 2nd Corps of General Anders under the command of the British Army under General Bernard Montgomery 's 8th Army, coming from Italy. These allied troops were stationed at Checkendon military camp from 1946 to 1948 and formed part of the Polish Resettlement Corps with the aim of integrating the Polish troops into British society. In 1947/1948 the camp's final Polish commanding officer was Major Greczyn, 16th Division of the 2nd Corps, winner of Cross for Valour, and the Monte Cassino Cross.

== Checkendon Polish civilians 1946-1961 and the Polish Resettlement Act 1947 ==
Checkendon Resettlement Hostel existed from 1948 to 1961.

The 2001 UK Census found that most of the Polish-born people had stayed or returned after serving with British forces during World War II. Henley on Thames and Reading, Berkshire were parts of this settlement. Data from that census showed that many Reading citizen were Polish-born. Notes to those data read: "The Polish Resettlement Act of 1947, which was designed to provide help and support to people who wished to settle here, covered about 190,000 people ... at the time Britain did not recognise many of the professional [qualifications] gained overseas ... [but] many did find work after the war; some went down the mines, some worked on the land or in steelworks. Housing was more of a problem, and many Poles were forced to live in barracks previously used for POWs ... The first generation took pains to ensure that their children grew up with a strong sense of Polish identity".

In summer 1948, a National Assistance Board camp for Polish war refugees displaced from India , Middle East and Africa, and was named as Checkendon camp or Checkendon Polish Resettlement Hostel. The resettlement camp was gradually opened over 1948-1952 and offered accommodation in about 150 Nissen huts for up to 1000 refugees. It was eventually closed in early 1961 and the Nissen huts abandoned or demolished.

== Checkendon camp amenities 1948-1961 ==
The Checkendon Polish Resettlement Camp consisted of about 150 corrugated metal Nissen huts and other brick built barracks, hidden away in beach woodland. By the late 1940s and throughout fifties, Checkendon camp had a bustling Polish community, with its own chapel and resident priest, as well as a nursery and primary school and teachers, and entertainment based in the Nissen huts. Children were taught their mother tongue and about Polish and British history, and went on field outtings to explore the English countryside. There was library stocked with both Polish and English books, a youth club and tennis and chess groups. Its football team won many trophies. An amateur dramatics group put on plays, a choir sang both Polish and English songs and there was a traditional Polish dance group. In addition, a 6-man dance band played regularly at dances held in the camp’s entertainment hall and weekly film shows were held there too. The former WW2 mortuary was used as a games and shooting hut including for the active Polish scout and guide group.

== Checkendon camp chapel and history of the parish ==
The Polish exiled community at Checkendon camp had their very own chapel Nissen Hut with bell tower. Traditional Polish religious festivals were held annually, and many couples were married in the chapel and their children baptised there and later held their first communion there over the years.

When the camp closed in 1961, the chapel was abandoned and in the 1990s the painted or stained glass windows and altar from the chapel were rescued for conservation and transferred to Sacred Heart Church, the Polish church at Watlington street, Reading, where people can still learn about their history.

== Checkendon camp and the Black Horse pub ==
The Black Horse public house at Scots Common is where four generations of pub landlords and ladies have known and welcomed the Polish diaspora upto today. Most notably the pub was known solely by generations of Polish families as "Maggies" after the wartime and postwar landlady.

In 2026 the Black Horse and Polish descendants of former Polish soldiers and of Checkendon Resettlement hostel organised the commemoration of the 80th anniversary of when Polish troops arrived at Checkendon, the guest of honour being centenarian Czeslaw Black (Blachucki) former 2nd Corps soldier stationed at Highmoor and Checkendon and one of the very last WW2 Polish soldier alive worldwide at the time of writing

== Polish cemetery at the Parish church ==
About 30 exiled Polish refugees from Checkendon Polish Resettlement Hostel lie buried in a special area of the cemetery of the Church of England parish church of Saint Peter and Saint Paul, a 12th-century Norman building. The building is Grade I listed.

The parish is now a member of The Langtree Team Ministry: a Church of England benefice that also includes the parishes of Ipsden, North Stoke, Stoke Row, Whitchurch-on-Thames and Woodcote.

== Heritage of Checkendon camp and Friends of Checkendon, Nettlebed and Kingwood camps ==
In 2025 a social media group was established as the Friends of Checkendon, Nettlebed and Kingwood camps with the aim to safeguard the memory of the camps and to bring together surviving Polish families connected with three former Polish Resettlement camps. The group quickly grew to almost 500 members, and later formed a link with the Checkendon Village parish council and village hall. It created a steering committee which meets regularly in Checkendon village, and has established expert groups on Checkendon camp and nearby Nettlebed camp.

Into 2026 the Friends of Checkendon, Nettlebed and Kingwood camps has been working towards a series of events to commemorate the arrival of the allied polish troops at Checkendon, initiating with a 1940s Polish Heritage Fete scheduled for 30 May 2026, and a subsequent Commemorative blue plaque unveiling dedicated to the 80th anniversary of allied Polish troops arriving at Checkendon, in collaboration and support of the British Army and the Embassy of Poland in London.

The Friends of Checkendon, Nettlebed and Kingwood camps are planning a major international reunion and event in 2028 to commemorate the 80th anniversary of the opening of the Checkendon Polish Resettlement Hostel, with attendees of former camp residents from as far afield as Australia, Canada, New Zealand, Poland and USA.

== Sources ==
- Zosia Biegus (2013). Polish resettlement camps in England and Wales 1946-1969. PB Software. ISBN 978-0-9569934-9-6.*Sherwood, Jennifer; Pevsner, Nikolaus (1974). Oxfordshire. The Buildings of England. Harmondsworth: Penguin Books. pp. 533–534. ISBN 0-14-071045-0.
