= Grove Music =

Grove Music may refer to:

- The New Grove Dictionary of Music and Musicians
- Grove Music, a company owned by composer and arranger Gwyn Arch
