= Health forecasting (disambiguation) =

Health Forecasting may refer to:

- Health Forecasting (UCLA), improving population health and reducing/eliminating health disparities by modeling how the future health of populations and sub-populations can be improved by implementation of effective evidence-based public health policies and programmatic interventions.
- Health Forecasting, a new healthcare discipline initiated by the Met Office and the National Health Service in the United Kingdom.
