= Sonning Common Health Walks =

The Sonning Common Health Walks was set up in 1996 by Dr William Bird, who is a general practitioner in Reading, Berkshire, England. The walks aim to reduce heart disease, reduce cholesterol and blood pressure, relieve depression and anxiety, reduce stress, help with weight management / obesity, and help with diabetes. Each walk is led by a leader who is a trained volunteer, who knows the route. Participants walk at their own pace but are advised to exert yourself to raise their heart rate and get them breathing faster.

Bird set up health walks from his practice in Sonning Common, Oxfordshire, and then worked with the Countryside Agency and the British Heart Foundation to expand it nationally.
