= St Peter and St Paul, Checkendon =

Coordinates: 51.5424°N 1.0450°W

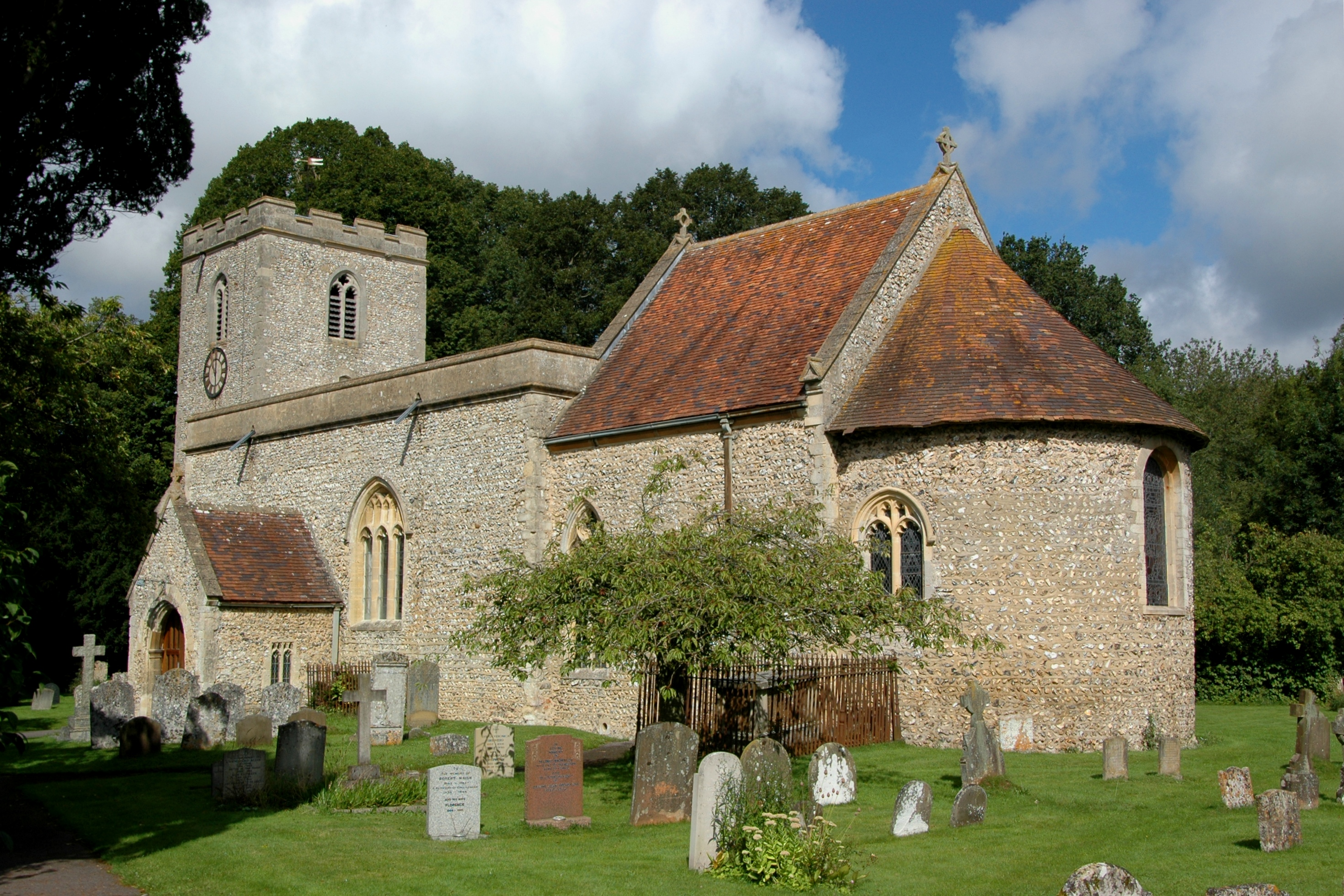
- view from the southeast

- Location in Oxfordshire
- OS grid reference: SU 6632583043
- Location: Checkendon, Oxfordshire
- Country: England
- Denomination: Church of England

History
- Status: Parish church
- Founded: c.634; 1392 years ago (reputed)
- Founder: Birinus (reputed)
- Dedication: Saint Peter and Saint Paul

Architecture
- Functional status: Active
- Heritage designation: Grade I
- Designated: 9 February 1959
- Architectural type: Norman

Administration
- Province: Canterbury
- Diocese: Oxford
- Archdeaconry: Dorchester
- Deanery: Henley

Clergy
- Rector: Rev. Kevin Davies

St Peter and St Paul is the Church of England parish church of Checkendon, a village in Oxfordshire, England. Its parish is part of the Deanery of Henley in the Diocese of Oxford. Its earliest parts are 12th-century and it is a Grade I listed building.

The church is a Norman building. All but one of the windows were replaced later in the Middle Ages with Decorated Gothic and Perpendicular Gothic ones, and the Perpendicular Gothic west tower is also a later addition.

The church is served by Langtree Team Ministry, which is also responsible for St Mary’s Church in Ipsden, St Mary’s Church in North Stoke, St John the Evangelist Church in Stoke Row, St John the Baptist in Whitchurch Hill, St Mary’s Church in Whitchurch-on-Thames, and St Leonard’s Church in Woodcote.

== Sources ==
- Long, E.T. (1972). "Medieval Wall Paintings in Oxfordshire Churches". Oxoniensia. XXXVII. Oxfordshire Architectural and Historical Society: 106–107.
- Sherwood, Jennifer; Pevsner, Nikolaus (1974). Oxfordshire. The Buildings of England. Harmondsworth: Penguin Books. pp. 533–534. ISBN 0-14-071045-0.
