= Timandra Harkness =

British writer, presenter and comedian

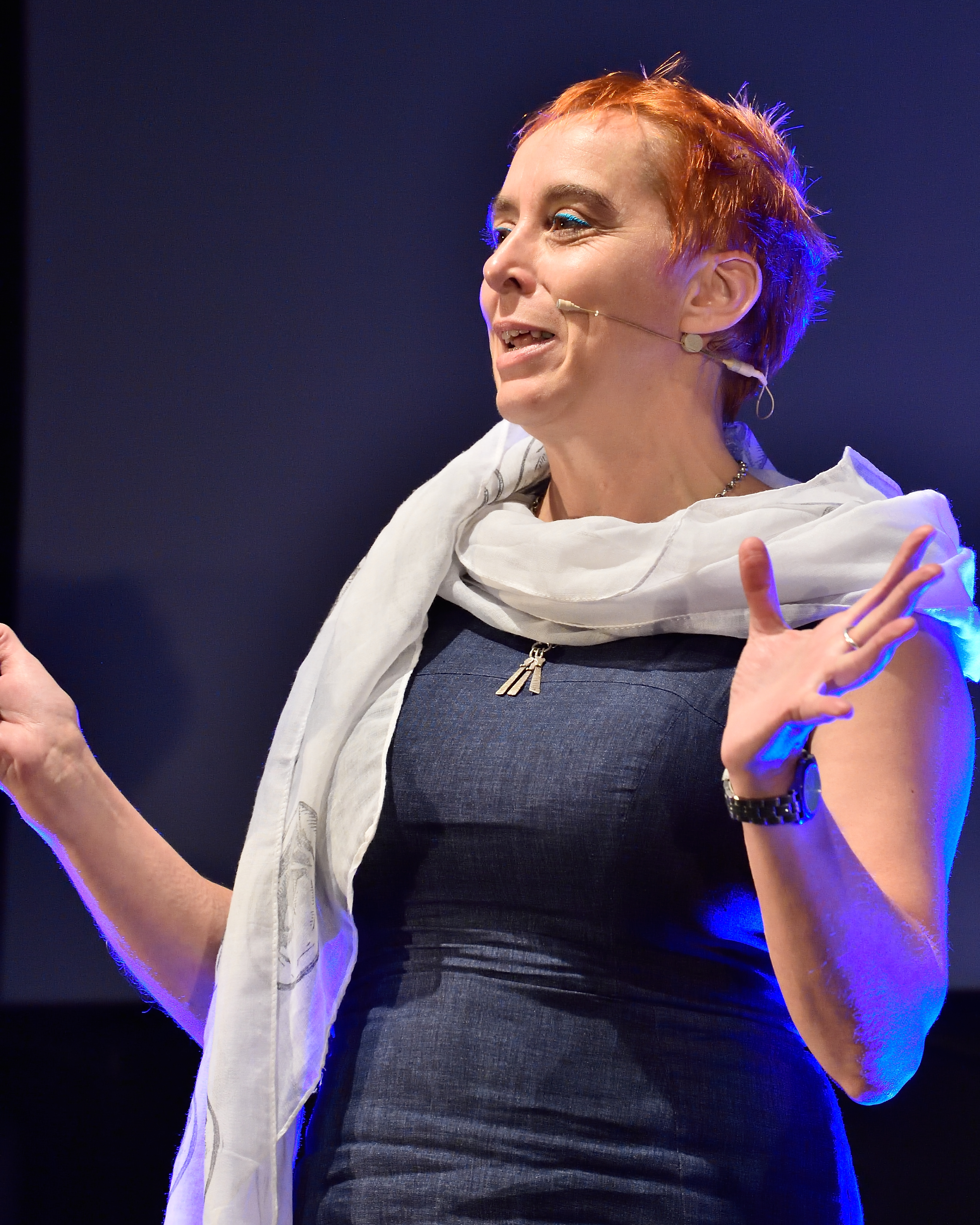
- Speaking at QEDcon in 2016
- Education: Bulmershe College; Open University
- Occupations: Writer; presenter; comedian
- Years active: 2000–present
- Notable work: Big Data: Does Size Matter
- Website: timandraharkness.com

Timandra Harkness is a British writer, presenter and comedian.

She has contributed to several publications, including BBC Science Focus magazine and The Daily Telegraph, and authored the book Big Data: Does Size Matter?. Harkness has co-written and performed comedy shows related to science and mathematics, including collaborations with her mother Linda Cotterill and comedian Matt Parker. Since 2016, she has chaired the Data Debate series for the Alan Turing Institute and the British Library. She is a Fellow of the Royal Statistical Society and a visiting fellow at the University of Winchester's Centre for Information Rights.

== Education ==
Harkness has a BA in Film and Drama with Art from Bulmershe College and a BSc in Mathematics & Statistics from the Open University, awarded in 2017. In 2021, she began postgraduate study in Philosophy at Birkbeck College, London, completing an MA degree in 2023.

== Career ==
=== Writer ===
Harkness has written about technology for BBC Science Focus magazine, about statistics for Significance (a popular science magazine published by the Royal Statistical Society), and about motorcycles for The Daily Telegraph.

Harkness is the author of the book Big Data: Does Size Matter? Her second book Technology is not the Problem was published in May 2024.

=== Broadcaster ===
Harkness' work for BBC Radio 4 includes an afternoon play, documentaries, being a roving reporter for The Human Zoo and presenting FutureProofing, a series about the future potential of science.

=== Performer ===
In 1999, Harkness co-wrote a comedy with her mother Linda Cotterill, called No Future in Eternity, about an astronomer who shares a flat with two angels. They received a grant from the Astronomer Royal for Scotland, John Campbell Brown, to perform the show at the Edinburgh Festival Fringe in 2000. The show was subsequently broadcast as an afternoon play on BBC Radio 4.

Since 2004, Harkness has collaborated with Dr Helen Pilcher, as a comedy duo named the Comedy Research Project, writing and performing stand-up shows about science.

In 2012, Harkness and fellow comedian Matt Parker co-wrote a comedy show called Your Days are Numbered: The Maths of Death. They performed the show in Australia, at the Adelaide Fringe and Melbourne International Comedy Festival, on tour around England and in Scotland, at the Edinburgh Festival Fringe.

Harkness returned to the Edinburgh Festival Fringe in 2019 to perform a one-woman show, called Take a Risk.

=== Data engagement ===
Since 2016, Harkness has chaired the Data Debate for the Alan Turing Institute and the British Library, a series of panel discussions about big data and its implications for society. She has spoken at the Hay Festival, the Battle of Ideas, TEDx, The Scotsman Data Conference and the Cheltenham Science Festival.

Harkness is a Fellow of the Royal Statistical Society (RSS), a founding member of their special interest group on Data Ethics. She was elected to serve on the Council of the RSS from 2024, and took over the chair of the editorial board of their magazine Significance at that time. Harkness is also a visiting fellow at the University of Winchester's Centre for Information Rights.

== Awards ==
In 1997, Harkness won a column-writing competition, organised by The Independent newspaper.

== Publications ==
- Big Data: Does Size Matter (2016)

== Radio ==
- No Future In Eternity (2001)
- Data, Data, Everywhere (2014)
- Personality Politics (2014)
- FutureProofing (2014–present)
- Hindsight Bias (2015)
- Perfect People (2015)
- Supersense Me (2017)
- The Why Factor: Are You A Numbers Person? (2017)
- How to Disagree: A Beginner's Guide to Having Better Arguments (2018)
- The Infinite Monkey Cage: Big Data (2018)
- Divided Nation (2019)
- What Has Sat-Nav Done to Our Brains? (2019)
- Five Knots (2020)
- Steelmanning (2021)

== Comedy ==
- The Comedy Research Project (2004)
- Your Days Are Numbered - The Maths of Death (2012)
- Brainsex (2013)
- Take A Risk (2019)
