= Pippa Ailion =

British theater director

Philipa 'Pippa' Ann Ailion MBE (born 20 September 1947) is a British Theatrical Director and Casting Director best known for her contributions to London (West End) theatre. Ailion has worked extensively in the West End and for film and television. She has cast Broadway and European productions, UK and US tours as well as seasons at Regent's Park Open Air Theatre, Chichester Festival Theatre and Crucible Theatre Sheffield. She has cast over 185 productions with a focus on productions that cast people of varying ethnicities.

== Early life ==
Ailion was born into a theatrical family in Mortlake London in 1947 to Philip Ailion and Pamela Mary Ailion (née Harris). In 1948 the Ailion family moved to Brighton where Philip and Pamela opened The Brighton Theatrical Costumiers. The company continued in Brighton until 1981. Philip was a tailor, cutter and makeup artist. The company served much of South East England including The Brighton Theatre Royal, the Brighton Hippodrome and other local professional and amateur productions and films. In Brighton and Hove, Ailion attended Hove County Grammar School and the Brighton and Hove School of Music and Drama. Later she attended Bulmershe College in Reading training as a teacher of English and Drama. Her drama tutor was Annie Castledine. After graduating in 1968 Ailion taught drama to school children and university students in Sussex and London before joining the Bowsprit Company of Greenwich Young People's Theatre (GYPT) in 1973 as an actor and teacher. She would later work with the main company as well.

== Career ==
=== Early Career: Actress and Director ===
In 1973 Ailion moved to New York when Playwright Neil Simon invited her to work as his assistant on the Broadway production of The Good Doctor. Soon thereafter, Ailion met Emanuel Azenberg and The Shubert Organization. There she worked as a Theatre Consultant giving casting suggestions for theatrical transfers from Broadway to London.

In 1975 Ailion returned to the UK where she performed in various productions at the Northcott Theatre in Exeter before taking a position in the theatre department at Dartington College of Arts from 1977-1981.

In 1981, she became the Assistant Director to Gordon Davidson and Company Manager on the award-winning London transfer of the Broadway play Children of a Lesser God. She later directed the production at the Market Theatre (Johannesburg), South Africa, Olympia Theatre (Dublin) as well as an Australian production. Ailion also directed the UK tour of this show.

From 1984-1987, Ailion worked as a freelance Resident Director and Company Manager for various West End shows including When We Are Married, A Month of Sundays, West Side Story, and An Italian Straw Hat.

In 1987 she joined The Old Vic Theatre as Resident Associate Director and Casting Director for Jonathan Miller, working on over a dozen European classics. During that time the theatre garnered five Olivier awards for The Tempest with Max Von Sydow, Too Clever by Half and The Liar with Alex Jennings and Candide with Patricia Routledge.

=== Casting Director and Educator ===
While at the Old Vic, Ailion also cast the original London production of Stephen Sondheim’s Into the Woods. This marked a shift in Ailion's career. In 1991, she set up her a casting company: Pippa Ailion Casting through which she worked as a freelance casting director for TV, commercials and theatre both in London and in Dublin, Ireland.

In 1994, Ailion joined the Central School of Speech and Drama as Head of Department for their BA Acting course, whilst continuing her freelance TV casting career including the multi award-winning TV movie Breaking The Code with Derek Jacobi. In 1997 she left her post when she was asked to cast the original London production of Rent and four productions at Chichester Festival Theatre. In 1998 she was asked to cast the original London production of Disney's The Lion King. From about this time Ailion's primary focus has been on London West End productions. Ailion serves as a Musical Theatre Advisor at the Royal Academy of Music.

=== Personal life ===
From 1973 to 1978 Ailion's partner was Roger Sell. Roger Sell headed the Theatre Department, Dartington College of Arts. In 1976, Ailion and Sell had one son, Mark Thomas Sell. Ailion's granddaughter, Olivia Charlotte Sell was born in 2007. In 2008 Ailion married Paul Hale. The couple share a home in Pevensey Bay, East Sussex.

==== Film and TV credits ====
- 1993 The Bill (TV Movie) (1 episode)
- 1995 Frankie Starlight (Feature Film)
- 1996 Breaking the Code (TV Movie)
- 1996 Witness Against Hitler (TV Movie)
- 1998 Little White Lies (TV Movie)
- 2002 Inquisition (TV Movie)
- 2009 The Fairy Queen (TV Movie)
- 2009 Great Performances (TV Movie) (1 episode)
- 2009 Chess in Concert
- 2014 Billy Elliot Live
- 2015 Gypsy: Live from the Savoy Theatre (TV Movie)
- 2019 Rocketman (Feature Film) (*Dancer casting)
- 2025 Disney’s Snow White (Feature Film) (*Dancer casting)

==== West End Theatre credits ====
Sources:

- 1988/89 Andromache (Old Vic)
- 1988/89 Bussy D’Ambois (Old Vic)
- 1988/89 Candide (Old Vic)
- 1988/89 King Lear (Old Vic)
- 1988/89 One Way Pendulum (Old Vic)
- 1988/89 The Tutor (Old Vic)
- 1989/90 As You Like It (Old Vic)
- 1989/90 A Flea in Her Ear (Old Vic)
- 1989/90 Marya (Old Vic)
- 1992 Annie Get Your Gun (Prince of Wales Theatre)
- 1993 Into The Woods (Phoenix Theatre)
- 1993 Hair (Old Vic)
- 1997 The Magistrate (Savoy Theatre)
- 1997-99 Beauty and the Beast (Dominion Theatre)
- 1998-99 Rent (Shaftesbury Theatre)
- 1999 The Prisoner of Second Avenue (Haymarket Theatre)
- 1999–present The Lion King (Lyceum)
- 2002-14 We Will Rock You (Dominion Theatre)
- 2005 Acorn Antiques the Musical (Haymarket)
- 2005-07 Blue Man Group (New London) and worldwide 2005-14
- 2005-16 Billy Elliot (Victoria Palace)
- 2006 Porgy and Bess (Savoy Theatre)
- 2006-19 Wicked (Apollo Victoria)
- 2007 The Drowsy Chaperone (Novello Theatre)
- 2008 Marguerite (Haymarket Theatre)
- 2009 Spring Awakening (Novello Theatre)
- 2009-12 Legally Blonde (Savoy Theatre)
- 2009 and 2012 The Fairy Queen
- 2010 Love Story (Duchess Theatre)
- 2010-11 Fela! (National Theatre) and US Tour (2011-2014)
- 2011-12 Million Dollar Quartet (Noël Coward Theatre)
- 2012 Sweeney Todd (Adelphi Theatre)
- 2012 Kiss Me, Kate (Old Vic)
- 2013-14 From Here to Eternity (Shaftesbury Theatre)
- 2013-17 Charlie and the Chocolate Factory (Theatre Royal, Drury Lane)
- 2013–present The Book of Mormon (Prince of Wales Theatre)
- 2014 The Pajama Game (Shaftesbury Theatre)
- 2014 Here Lies Love (National Theatre)
- 2014-15 Memphis (Shaftesbury Theatre)
- 2015 Gypsy (Savoy Theatre)
- 2015-16 Bend It Like Beckham (Phoenix Theatre)
- 2016 The Go Between (Apollo Theatre)
- 2016 Funny Girl (Savoy Theatre)
- 2016 Guys and Dolls (Savoy Theatre), (Phoenix Theatre)
- 2016-17 Sunny Afternoon (Harold Pinter Theatre)
- 2016-19 Dreamgirls (Savoy Theatre)
- 2016-19 Motown (Shaftesbury Theatre)
- 2017 Wind in the Willows (London Palladium)
- 2018 Twelfth Night (Young Vic)
- 2018–present Tina - The Tina Turner Musical (Aldwych Theatre)
- 2019 On Your Feet (London Coliseum)
- 2019–present Come From Away (Phoenix Theatre)
- 2020 Beauty and Beast (UK Tour)
- 2020 Get Up Stand Up (Lyric Theatre)
- 2020 Dreamgirls (UK tour)
- 2021-22 Spring Awakening (Almeida Theatre)
- 2022 Moulin Rouge (Piccadilly Theatre)
- 2023 Ain't Too Proud (Prince Edward Theatre)
- 2024 Mean Girls (Savoy Theatre)
- 2024 MJ The Musical (Prince Edward Theatre)
- 2024 Hello Dolly (London Palladium)
- 2025 Disney’s Hercules (Theatre Royal, Drury Lane)

== Awards, accolades and achievements ==
- In 2023 Ailion won a "Special Recognition" Olivier Award.
- In 2023 Ailion also received a What’s On Stage award for "Best Casting" for Spring Awakening.
- In 2020 Ailion was awarded the Casting Director Award for "Best Musical" for Come from Away.
- In 2018 Ailion was awarded the MBE for services to Theatre and Diversity in the Arts and was listed in the 2018 New Years Honors Roll.
- In 2018 Ailion was named a patron of the Urdang Academy.
- In 2017 Ailion was listed by The Stage as one of London's 100 most influential power players in its "Theatre’s Power List 2017".
- From 2010 to 2017 Ailion served as a Trustee of the Regents Park Open Air Theatre.
- In 2009 Ailion was made a Companion at The Liverpool Institute for Performing Arts
- Ailion is a member of the Casting Directors Guild of Great Britain
- Ailion is listed in Who's Who.
