= Exlade Street =

Hamlet in Oxfordshire, England

Coordinates: 51.532°N 1.053°W

- Location within Oxfordshire
- OS grid reference: SU658819
- Civil parish: Checkendon
- District: South Oxfordshire
- Shire county: Oxfordshire
- Region: South East
- Country: England
- Sovereign state: United Kingdom
- Post town: Reading
- Postcode district: RG8
- Dialling code: 01491
- Police: Thames Valley
- Fire: Oxfordshire
- Ambulance: South Central
- UK Parliament: Henley
- Website: http://www.checkendon.org

Exlade Street is a hamlet in Checkendon civil parish in Oxfordshire, about 6 miles (9.7 km) northwest of Reading, in the Chiltern Hills. The hamlet is about 445 feet (136 m) above sea level.

== Toponymy ==
The toponym is derived from the Old English personal name Ecgi and slaed, meaning "valley". Ecgi slaed was originally an ancient British upland farm complex owned by Ecgi and set in the valley today occupied by Exlade Street. Exlade is also recorded variously as Hekeslad (1241) Egesflade (1278) Eggeslade (1285) Egeslade (1360) Egslade (1366) and Egguslhade (1406). By the later medieval period, 'street' was often used to describe straggling villages in areas of late woodland clearance. Such places as Exlade Street in the Chilterns and Paley Street east of Reading are instances.

== History ==
Evidence of the activity of early man in the area was found when a Neolithic flint tranchet axe (5 1/2 inches long) dating from circa 3,000 BC was dug up in the garden of Mulberry Cottage and this is now held in Reading Museum. In early Medieval time Exlade Street was a dependent settlement of South Stoke and the earliest written record of it dates from 1241. From 1094 South Stoke and its dependent settlements belonged to Eynsham Abbey. In 1366 the Abbey had 348.5 acres (141 ha) of wood at Exlade Street.

Early references show an Exlade Street resident, John de Eggeslade, recorded as a Witness at the Oxford Coroners Court on Friday, 8 June 1324 John was obviously a popular Exlade Street name as another John de Eggesalde is also recorded in the Benson Manor rolls in May 1400 standing bail for William Shaldeston - who had been excommunicated by, Henry, Bishop of Lincoln. In 1323 Walter son and heir of Peter Cock' of Checkendon to Sweyn de Mortele and Alice his wife: Grant of rents from tenements in Exlade, in South Stoke (Eggeslade in Stoke Abbots) (it is speculated that Cocks Hill in Exlade Street may have got its name from the family of Peter Cock who owned land in Exlade Street and Checkendon) and 1362 sees the sale of land in Eggeslade by Henry de Aldrynton' and Elizabeth, his wife. Dame Isabel Pryour, lady of Shiplake rent from Thomas Hoke, John Crouche, and John Passelewe of Egslade: a tenement called 'le Cokus' and land in Checkendon in 1399. The land Le Cokus may be the current Corkers Farm - which is located just above the Exlade Street

The Passelewe family also owned Payables farm and many worked as woodwards - who managed the woodland which surrounded Exlade Street and was owned by Eynsham Abbey. Abbot's wood is just east of Exlade Street comprising 348 acres and was given to Eynsham abbey in 1109, the abbey retained Abbot's wood, which first appears under this name in 1536, until the dissolution of the monasteries, when it was given to Christ Church and became known as Abbotts or College wood. Holly Shaw (a strip of woodland on the edge of the Hamlet) is another indication of the wooded nature of the land. Shaws, in the Oxfordshire Chilterns, were strips of woodland left as field boundaries after the clearance of woodland

In 1597, during the reign of Queen Elizabeth I, it was recorded that the vicar of South Stoke held services at St. Leonard's Woodcote only on Christmas Day, Easter Day and a few other days each year. Some worshippers travelled 3 miles (4.8 km) each way to South Stoke to go to church, but most preferred to travel less than 1 mile (1.6 km) to Saint Peter and Saint Paul in the adjacent parish of Checkendon. The law obliged everyone to worship in their own parishes, so since 1595 the Rector of Checkendon had prosecuted people from Exlade Street in the local archdeacon's court for coming to his church. In response the faithful of Exlade Street and Woodcote petitioned John Whitgift, Archbishop of Canterbury for permission to worship at Checkendon. Whitgift granted the request, so long as they continued to attend their parish church in South Stoke four times a year

== World War Two ==
Leslie Marcham - Private 4th Battalion, Oxfordshire and Buckinghamshire Light Infantry - Died 30 May 1944 is recorded on the Woodcote War Memorial. Marcham worked for Lawrence Hignett at Hook End Farm, Checkendon before joining up. He was already a member of the Territorial Army and is believed to have been one of the first local boys to be called up for active service. His family lived opposite The Greyhound (now The Highwayman).

=== RAF Woodcote ===
In September 1941 the RAF announced that four new Equipment Dispersal Depots were then under construction and that No.70 Woodcote was one of them. It was to be placed in No.40 Group, Maintenance Command. A Headquarters Site and three separate sites needed to be built, 1 mile (1.6 km) to 3 miles (4.8 km) apart and not unduly conspicuous from the air and therefore difficult to attack. The attraction of the local area was the ancient beech woodlands on the edge of the village, most of which was owned by Christ Church. The woodland provided a natural camouflage from the air. A total of over 176 acres (71 ha) of mixed woodland and open pasture bordered by some 7 miles (11 km) of winding country lanes was requisitioned on compulsory leases from a number of local landowners on a total compensation rental of £100 pa.

Site 3 covered 63.5 acres (25.7 ha) on the edges of the road to Exlade Street. The site to the west of the road and also bordering Deadmans Lane was owned also by Christ Church College, while the site to the east was owned by Lawrence Hignett. The initial establishment was eight RAF Officers and 476 civilians and during the next few months the civilian establishment was increased to 755. The role of the Unit was to hold a range of stores for the use of the RAF. Evidence of the huge amount of equipment, stores and buildings hidden in the local woods can still be seen in Abbey Wood with large concrete foundations, water storage tanks and blast shelters.

== Buildings ==
Exlade Street currently has twelve private houses and a pub. Many of the houses are Grade II listed buildings and started life as farms and farm/woodland workers' cottages. Carter's Cottage, the oldest building surviving is a cruck cottage that dates from before 1550. The public house, the Highwayman Inn, formally The Greyhound, also dates from the 16th century. The hamlet used to be larger, but two houses burnt down in the early part of the 20th century. The Exlade Street blacksmith's forge previously stood in the car park of the Highwayman Inn and there were several large barns for storing and working wood from the local area. The South Oxfordshire Archaeological Group (SOAG) estimates that up to 30 additional buildings existed. In the 1980s SOAG's founder, Cynthia Graham Kerr, researched the buildings and landscape of Exlade Street. SOAG and the Oxfordshire Woodland Group are now leading a new multipart project, which includes: searching for lost buildings; understanding how local timber buildings were constructed and studying how the local woodlands were exploited for these purposes, in particular how extant sawpits were used to convert timbers.

One of the houses in Exlade Street, White Shutters, has a bench mark recorded on the side. This is a chiseled horizontal mark that surveyors made in stone structures, into which an angle-iron could be placed to form a "bench" for a leveling rod, thus ensuring that a leveling rod could be accurately repositioned in the same place in the future. These marks were usually indicated with a chiseled arrow below the horizontal line.

== Sources ==
- Emery, Frank (1974). The Oxfordshire Landscape. The Making of the English Landscape. London: Hodder & Stoughton. pp. 96, 115. ISBN 0-340-04301-6.
- Lobel, Mary D, ed. (1962). A History of the County of Oxford: Volume 7: Thame and Dorchester Hundreds. Victoria County History. pp. 93–112.
