= Gwyn Arch =

British musical arranger and choirmaster (1931–2021)

- Born: 5 April 1931; Southampton
- Died: 6 June 2021 (aged 90); Sonning Common
- Occupations: Composer, choir director
- Children: Dave Arch
- Awards: Member of the Order of the British Empire

Gwyn Arch MBE (4 May 1931 – June 2021) was a British musical arranger, composer, and choir director.

== Early life ==
Arch was born in Southampton on 4 May 1931, to a Welsh father. He grew up in Birmingham and then Ipswich, where he attended secondary school. His mother was a poet, and his father worked as a missionary to deaf and dumb people. After national service he studied English at Selwyn College, University of Cambridge. He played in jazz bands there and at Wadham College, Oxford, where he took a postgraduate diploma in education.

== Career ==
Arch taught English at Rickmansworth Grammar School for nine years, studying musical composition at Trinity College London in his spare time. He was director of music at Bulmershe College in Berkshire from 1964 to 1985, where he founded the Bulmershe Girls Choir. In the 1960s he arranged music for BBC Home Service radio programmes for schools, and in the 1970s, he made several appearances, as a conductor, on the BBC Television programme Seeing and Believing.

In 1969 the publishers B. Feldman asked Arch to contribute to the Pop Cantata school music genre established by its rival Novello and Co., in works such as The Daniel Jazz (by Herbert Chappell) and Jonah-man Jazz (by Michael Hurd). Setting a text by his colleague Patrick Rooke, Arch composed Creation Jazz, a lively account of how God created the world. It is a fifteen minute work of seven songs linked by recitative sections. It was broadcast by BBC Television on 1 February 1970.

He was musical director of the South Chiltern Choral Society for almost 50 years, retiring in 2014. In 1971 he established the Reading Male Voice Choir and served as the choir's musical director until 2015. He was a Licentiate of the Royal Academy of Music, a Composition Fellow of Trinity College London, and for ten years an Associated Board examiner. His oeuvre includes many arrangements of choral works and songs, in a wide variety of genres, for mixed (SATB), male (TTBB), and female (SSA) choirs. He marketed many of his arrangements for male voice choirs as sheet music via his company Grove Music. (Note: Not to be confused with the Grove Dictionary of Music.)

== Honours ==
Arch was appointed a Member of the Order of the British Empire (MBE) in the 2006 Birthday Honours, for services to music in Berkshire.

The Gwyn Arch Foundation was launched in his memory on 9 April 2022 at a celebration concert featuring several of the choirs he founded. It aims "to support the development and performance of choral music by and for young people within the Thames Valley".

== Personal life ==
Arch met Jane, subsequently a head teacher, when he was at Oxford University, where he was musical director of the Experimental Theatre Club and she was in the choir. They married two years later, and moved to Sonning Common in 1964. Their elder son David Arch is a conductor, arranger and composer and the musical director on the BBC Television show Strictly Come Dancing.

Arch died on 6 June 2021.
