= Ben Townsend =

English footballer

Personal information
- Date of birth: 8 October 1981 (age 45)
- Place of birth: Reading, England
- Position: Defender

Senior career*
Years	Team	Apps	(Gls)
1999–2003	Wycombe Wanderers	13	(0)
2003–2004	Woking	54	(1)
2004	Farnborough	14	(1)
- Maidenhead United
- Basingstoke Town
- * Club domestic league appearances and goals

Ben Townsend (born 8 October 1981) is an English footballer who played in the Football League for Wycombe Wanderers.

Townsend was born in Reading, Berkshire, and attended Chiltern Edge School. He has played for Wycombe Wanderers, Woking, Farnborough Town, Maidenhead United and Basingstoke Town. He played in the Wycombe Wanderers side that faced Liverpool in the FA Cup Semi-Final of 2001.
