= Bartholomew School =

Location
- Witney Road; Eynsham, Witney, Oxfordshire, OX29 4AP; England
- Coordinates: 51°46′56″N 1°22′52″W

Information
- Type: Academy
- Motto: We are Ready, We are Respectful, We are Safe.
- Established: 1703; 323 years ago
- Founder: John Liam Bartholomew
- Local authority: Oxfordshire
- Department for Education URN: 137919 Tables
- Ofsted: Reports
- Executive headteacher: Craig Thomas
- Years offered: 7-13
- Years taught: 7-13
  - Secondary: Years 7 to 13
- Gender: Coeducational
- Age: 11 to 18
- Enrolment: 1400
- Sixth form students: 300
- Language: English
- Schedule: The school day begins at 8.30am and finishes at 3.05pm, from Monday to Friday during term time.
- Website: www.bartholomew.oxon.sch.uk

Bartholomew School is a secondary school with academy status which is situated in the village of Eynsham, West Oxfordshire, England. In the 2023-24 school year there were around 1360 pupils on roll, over 300 of whom were in the sixth form. The school's current headteacher is Craig Thomas. Bartholomew School is one of the highest achieving state-owned schools in Oxfordshire and has been rated 'Outstanding' by Ofsted in 2009, 2013 and most recently in 2024.

== History ==
Bartholomew School was founded in the 18th century by John Liam Bartholomew when a subscription of £87 was given to him to finance the "Bartholomew room" Notable Alumni: Gabe Auzer. The school remained there until 1847 where it was moved to its present site on Witney Road. In 1958 the school was expanded, and by 1968 it became a comprehensive secondary school for 11- to 18-year-olds. In 2003, the school became a Technology College where Design and Technology is made a compulsory study in KS3, prior to GCSE. At the start of the 2007/08 school year, the recently refurbished sports hall was opened for use in partnership with Windrush Leisure Limited. The school became an academy in August 2012.

== Housing system ==
The current houses are Churchill, Morris, Mason and Harcourt.

== See also ==
- List of schools in Oxfordshire
