= William Bird (doctor) =

British general practitioner

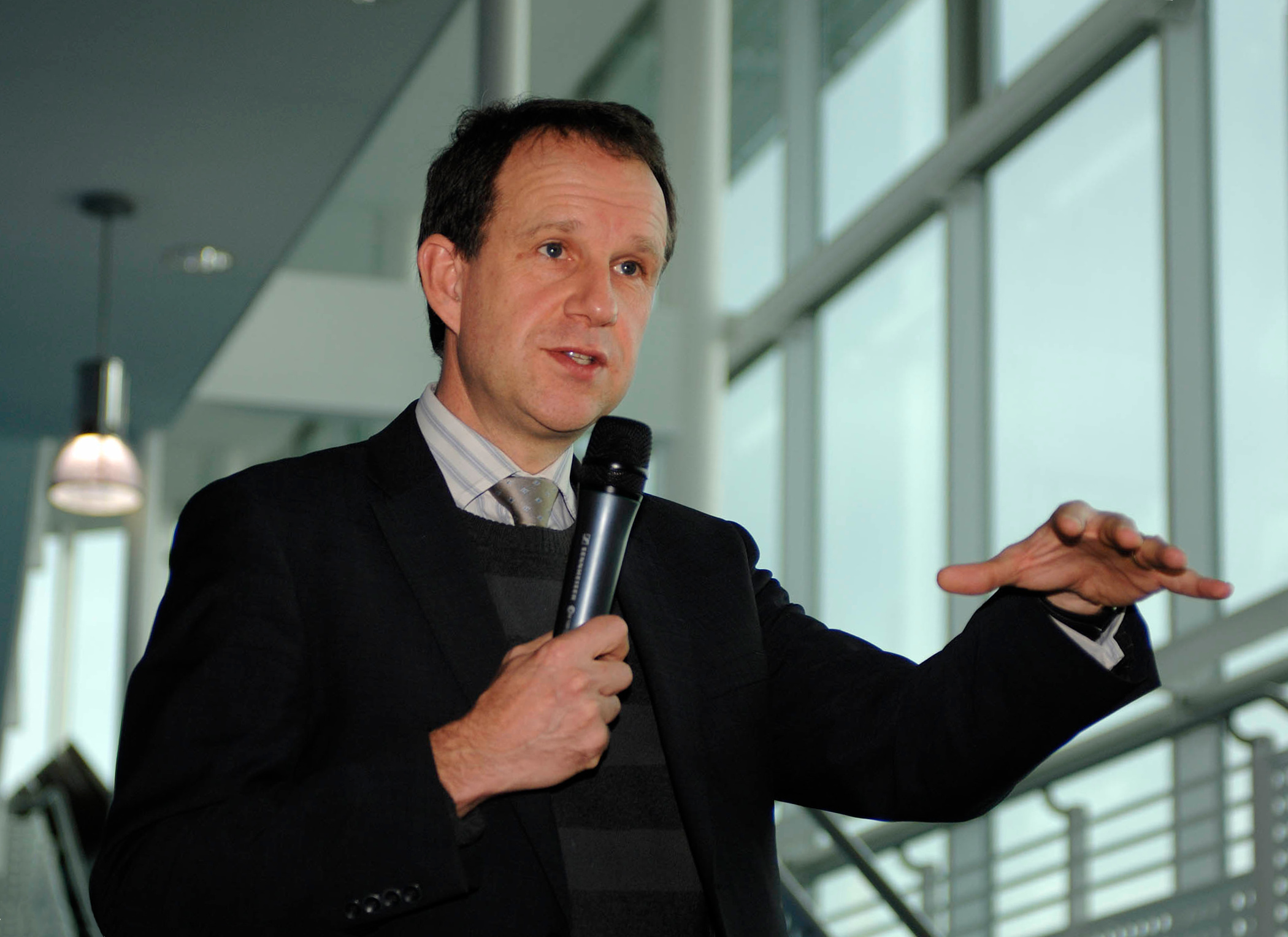
- Bird in 2010
- Born: Charles William Handley Bird; 16 May 1961 (age 65); England
- Occupation: General practitioner CEO
- Known for: Exercise promotion and health forecasting
- Title: Dr
- Spouse: Annie
- Children: 3

William Bird is a general practitioner in Reading, Berkshire, England. He has set up schemes to encourage people in the United Kingdom to exercise in order to promote good health, and he was appointed MBE for his contributions to health and physical activity in the Queen's New Year Honours 2010. In 2009 he was nominated by The Independent on Sunday as one of the 100 people to make people happy in Britain.

== Health forecasting ==
Bird helped to set up a health forecasting unit at the Met Office where he was clinical director for five years. The forecasts help the public and health professionals plan for of weather-related illness.

== Green Gym ==
Bird set up the first Green Gym at Sonning Common, Oxfordshire in 1998 to promote physical activity and well-being in the participants who volunteer to work on environmental or conservation projects. Working with The Conservation Volunteers the scheme now has about 100 centres in the UK and one in Australia.

== Walking initiatives ==
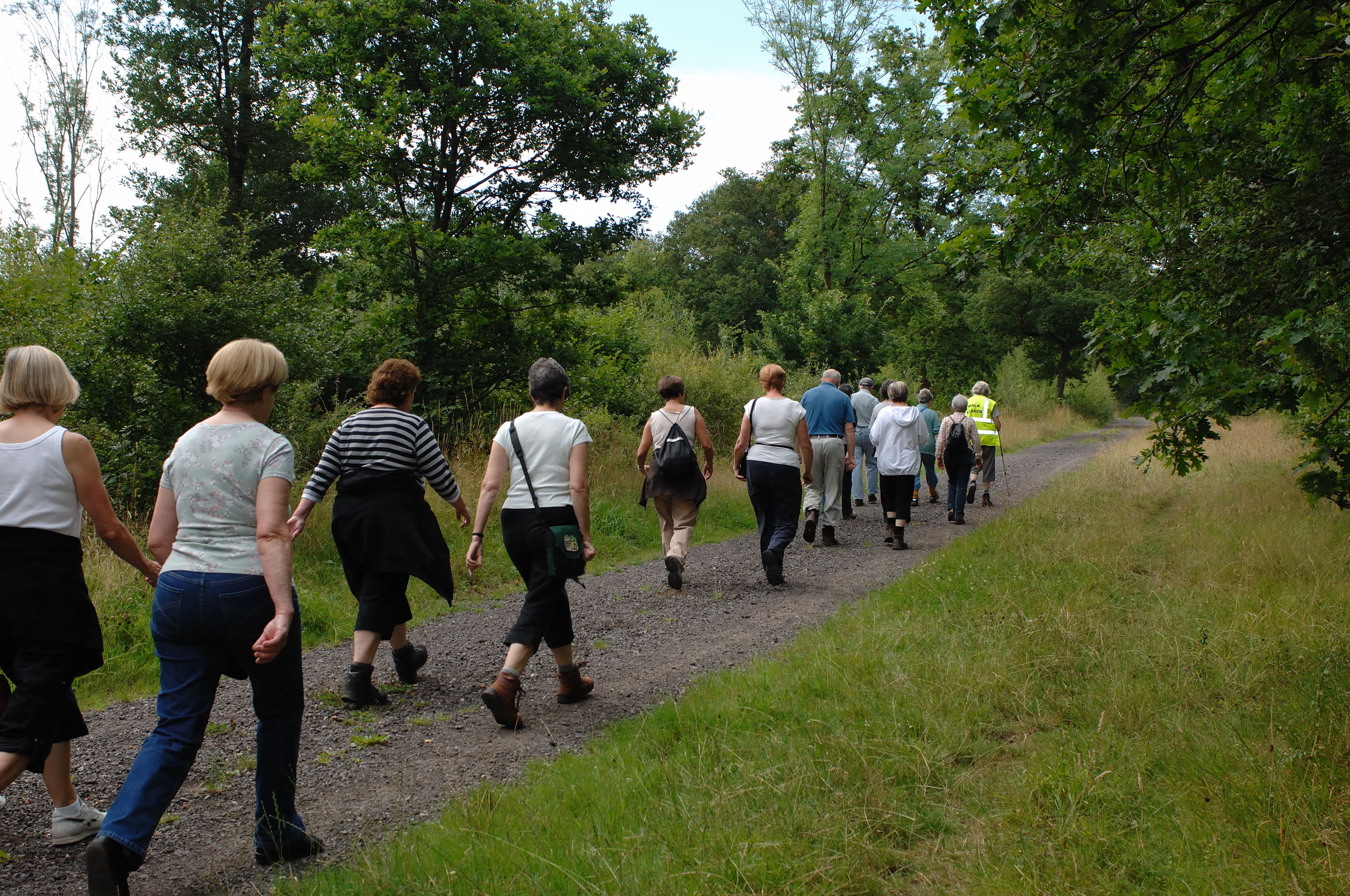
Walkers following the walk leader in Epsom, England

Bird set up health walks from his practice in Sonning Common and then worked with the Countryside Agency and the British Heart Foundation to expand it nationally. The aim is to have a nationwide network where every GP can recommend a local walk for those inactive patients who need to become more active.

In 2012 Bird started the Beat the Street International Walk to School Competition. The challenge encouraged children to walk to school, and compete with schools around the world to walk the greatest total distance. Bird said he started the challenge, funded by London Legacies 2012, "to help reduce congestion, improve their health and interact with other children around the world." Following the initial success of the competition, Beat the Street has now been launched in more towns and cities with 1,000,000 participants worldwide.

== Business ==
Bird is CEO of Intelligent Health, a limited company he founded in 2006 to promote physical activity. In 2012 it delivered part of the Olympic Legacy for NHS London called My Best Move where Dr Bird trained General Practitioners in London about physical activity. It also delivers the physical activity initiative Beat The Street in the UK and worldwide.

== Personal life ==
Bird is married to Annie. They have three children.

== Books ==
- William Bird, Veronica Reynolds: Walking for Health and Happiness. Reader's Digest, 2002, ISBN 0-7621-0364-7.
- William Bird, Matilda van den Bosch, Oxford Textbook of Nature & Public Health, Oxford University Press, 2018, ISBN 9780198725916
