= Maiden Erlegh Chiltern Edge =

Location
- Reades Lane, Sonning Common, Oxfordshire, RG4 9LN; England; 51.5134°N 0.9911°W

Information
- Type: Academy
- Local authority: Oxfordshire
- Trust: Maiden Erlegh Trust
- Department for Education URN: 146103 Tables
- Ofsted: Reports
- Headteacher: Emma Bliss
- Gender: Coeducational
- Age: 11 to 16
- Enrolment: 450
- Website: https://www.maidenerleghchilternedge.co.uk/

Maiden Erlegh Chiltern Edge (formerly Chiltern Edge Community School) is a coeducational secondary school located in Sonning Common, Oxfordshire, England.

Students come from Caversham, Emmer Green, Sonning Common, Henley on Thames, Shiplake and other nearby areas in both Oxfordshire and Berkshire.

Previously a community school and Language College administered by Oxfordshire County Council, in August 2018 Chiltern Edge Community School converted to academy status and was renamed Maiden Erlegh Chiltern Edge. The school is now sponsored by the Maiden Erlegh Trust.

Maiden Erlegh Chiltern Edge is also the location of the secondary department of Bishopswood School.

== Notable alumni ==
- Fran Kirby – England football player.
- Natalie Dormer – actress.
- David Arch – pianist, conductor, arranger and composer.
- Ben Townsend - footballer.
- Sam Townsend - Olympic rower.
