= Bishopswood School =

- Oxfordshire; England

Information
- Type: Special school Academy
- Established: 1977
- Local authority: Oxfordshire
- Trust: The Propeller Academy Trust
- Department for Education URN: 149322 Tables
- Ofsted: Reports
- Head of School: Priya Bhagrath
- Gender: Coeducational
- Age: 2 to 16
- Enrolment: 44 as of April 2016
- Website: https://www.bishopswoodschool.co.uk/

Bishopswood School is a coeducational special school located in Oxfordshire, England.

It was established in 1977, Bishopswood School educates pupils with severe, profound or complex learning disabilities and difficulties, and is based over three sites:

- A nursery department located at Valley Road Primary School in Henley-on-Thames
- A primary department located at Sonning Common Primary School in Sonning Common
- A secondary department located at Maiden Erlegh Chiltern Edge in Sonning Common

Previously a community school administered by Oxfordshire County Council, In January 2023 Bishopswood School converted to academy status. The school is now sponsored by The Propeller Academy Trust.
