= Greyfriars Catholic School =

Location
- Cricket Road; Oxford, Oxfordshire, OX4 3DR; England
- Coordinates: 51.73761°N 1.22686°W

Information
- Type: Academy
- Motto: 'Opera in Caritate'
- Religious affiliation: Roman Catholic
- Established: 2004
- Department for Education URN: 146800 Tables
- Ofsted: Reports
- Headteacher: Lyndsey Caldwell
- Gender: Mixed
- Age: 11 to 19
- Houses: St Irenaeus; St Frideswide; St Josephine; St Edmund
- Website: https://www.greyfriarsoxford.org.uk

Greyfriars Catholic School is a mixed Roman Catholic secondary school with academy status, located in Cowley, Oxfordshire, England. At the end of the 2021–22 academic year, the school was renamed from St Gregory the Great Catholic School.

It is one of only two state-funded Catholic schools offering secondary education in that county, the other being Blessed George Napier Roman Catholic School in Banbury. The previous executive principal John Hussey, joined the school as acting headteacher in 2008. He later was appointed to the role of permanent headteacher in the spring term of 2009. The school converted to academy status in April 2013, and became the lead school in the Dominic Barberi Multi-Academy Company a month later. In June 2020 however, St Gregory's, along with several of the other schools formerly in the Dominic Barberi Multi-Academy Company joined the Pope Francis Multi-Academy Company.

Previously, in January 2018 the school announced that the Principal and Vice Principal were "currently on leave", with a new temporary head standing in.

== Funding for new buildings ==
Until funding for the new buildings was finalized in 2006, the school existed on two sites: the Cardinal Newman Middle School on Cricket Road, and St Augustine's, Iffley Turn, Oxford. However, after receiving a £20,000,000 grant from the Roman Catholic Archdiocese of Birmingham, the current buildings were built. Work began in March 2014 on the adjacent former Cricket Road Centre to convert it into the school's new primary school, for children aged 4–11. However, in October 2020 the primary phase of the school was formally split from St Gregory's, becoming St Frideswide Church of England Primary School. St Gregory's continues to be a Catholic school for secondary age pupils.

== Progress ==
In a Section 8 Ofsted report, in December 2015, the Inspector found that 'senior leaders and governors are taking effective action to tackle areas requiring improvement identified in the March 2015 Section 5 inspection in order to become a good school.' In the earlier report published in April 2015, the school was described as "Requires Improvement", although Early Years provision and the sixth form were rated "Good". That report had cited low expectations of pupils as the reason for attainment being below the national average. GCSE results released in January 2016 show the school has the lowest GCSE attainment out of all state schools in Oxfordshire by percentage of students receiving 5A* to C including English and Maths. This fell year on year to 43% of students achieving the government's GCSE benchmark.

In May 2017 the school was placed into Special Measures by Ofsted Inspectors found that a 'small minority of pupils seriously misbehave and a greater number regularly disrupt lessons'.

In January 2021 the school applied for a "New Start" academy conversion, meaning previous Ofsted Reports and performance measures were disassociated with the new school.

In October 2023, the school received a 'Good' judgement from Ofsted.
