= South Stoke, Oxfordshire =

Village in Oxfordshire, England

South Stoke
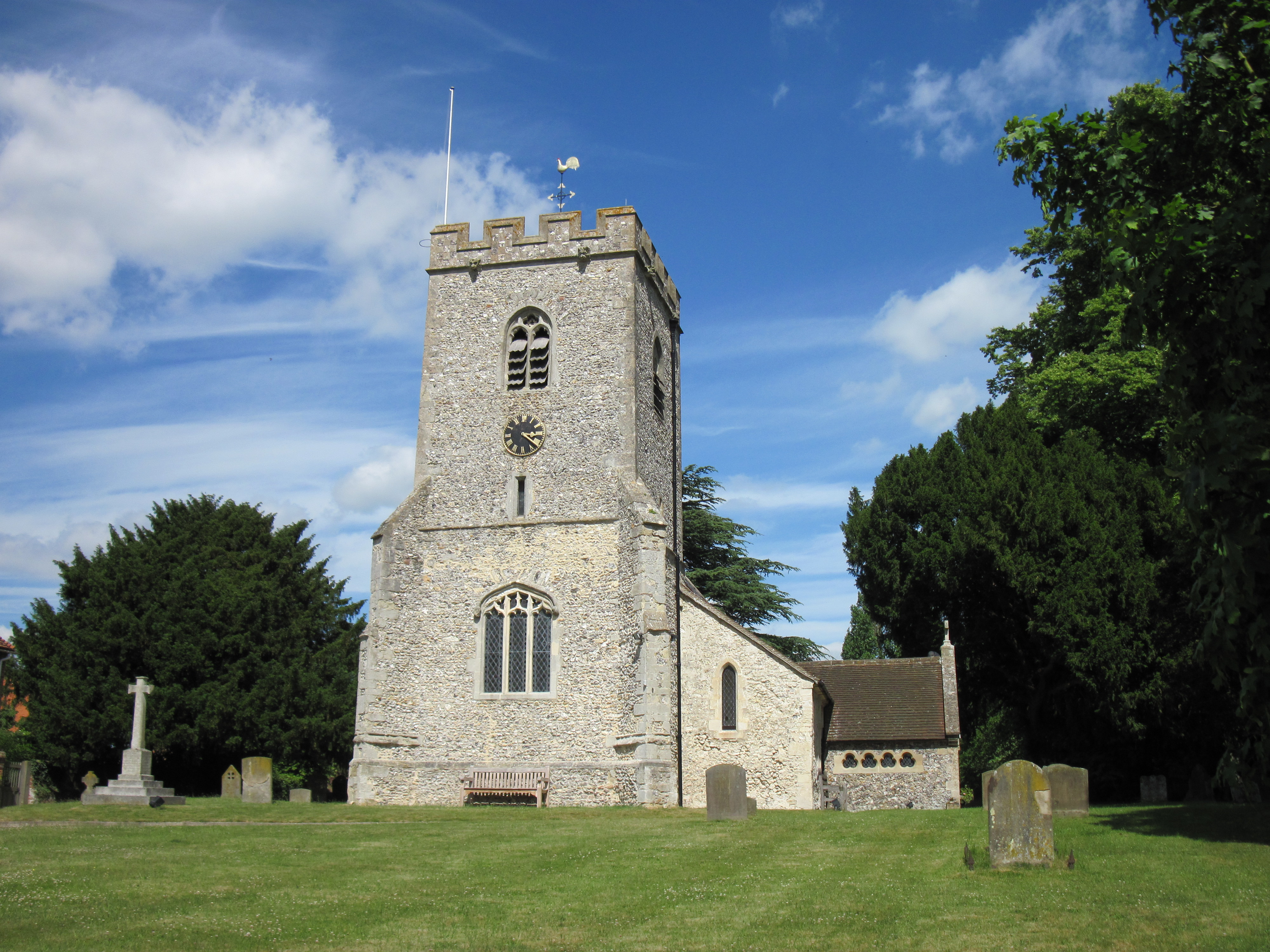
- St. Andrew's parish church

- Location within Oxfordshire
- Area: 7.68 km^{2} (2.97 sq mi)
- Population: 458 (parish (2001 census)
  - Density: 60/km^{2} (160/sq mi)
- OS grid reference: SU6083
- Civil parish: South Stoke
- District: South Oxfordshire
- Shire county: Oxfordshire
- Region: South East
- Country: England
- Sovereign state: United Kingdom
- Post town: Reading
- Postcode district: RG8
- Dialling code: 01491
- Police: Thames Valley
- Fire: Oxfordshire
- Ambulance: South Central
- UK Parliament: Henley and Thame
- Website: South Stoke village

South Stoke is a village and civil parish on an east bank of the Thames, about 1.5 miles (2.4 km) north of Goring-on-Thames in South Oxfordshire. It includes less than 1 mile (1.6 km) to its north the hamlet and manor house of Littlestoke (a.k.a. Stoke Marmion).

== Manor ==
In 975 King Edgar granted Osweard land at Stoke, probably later the South Stoke and Offham manors. The manor passed to Eynsham Abbey in 1094. At the time of the Hundred Rolls in 1279, South Stoke had 40 tenants and only three freeholders. Woodcote, 3 miles (5 km) east of South Stoke, had developed as a dependent settlement by 1109. It was followed by Exlade Street by 1241 and Greenmoor by 1366.

== Churches ==
The Church of England parish church of Saint Andrew was built in the 13th century and still has Early English Gothic features including the three-bay arcade between the nave and the north aisles, windows in the north wall of the chancel and the east and west ends of the south and north aisle. The east window of the south aisle has late 13th century stained glass of the Virgin and Child. In the 14th century the present font was carved, a new chancel arch was built and new windows were inserted in the east and south walls of the chancel and the north and south walls of the nave. The west tower is a Perpendicular Gothic addition. In 1857 the church was restored, the south arcade was rebuilt and south aisle was widened. The architect for these works was J.B. Clacy of Reading. The Vicarage was designed by the Gothic Revival architect Charles Buckeridge and built in 1869. In 1820 a chapel was built for the Countess of Huntingdon's Connexion. It is now a private house.

== Economy and society ==
Isambard Kingdom Brunel built Moulsford Railway Bridge in 1839–40. South Stoke has a public house, the Perch and Pike. The Ridgeway path runs through the village to access its ferry to Moulsford which is seasonal.

== Notable residents ==
- Henry Paget, Earl of Uxbridge
- Admiral Sir Charles Hardy
- Sir Sydney Cotton (1792–1874), of the Indian Army
- Richard Lynch Cotton, Vice-Chancellor of Oxford University
- Edward Bulwer Lytton, author
- Detmar Blow, architect.

== Littlestoke ==
51.562°N 1.134°W
Littlestoke is a hamlet on the River Thames sometimes seen in texts as Little Stoke. Littlestoke is on the old road that linked Wallingford and Reading via Goring Heath. Littlestoke has a manor house, still a farmhouse with a smaller estate than previously, which has three outlying associated barns, listed for their architecture. A ferryman until at least 1920 used to be available to cross the Thames to Cholsey. The Ridgeway path runs past the site of the ferry, however now a minor detour is necessary along the national long-distance footpath to South Stoke itself and then north from Moulsford on the opposite bank. As mentioned the South Stoke ferry is seasonal. Between the two, downstream is Moulsford Railway Bridge.

== Public Transport ==
From 6 June 2012, South Stoke was served by Go Ride bus service number 134 from Wallingford to Goring-on-Thames. Following the decision by Oxfordshire County Council to axe all bus service subsidies in July 2016, Go Ride ceased operating bus services in Oxfordshire in January 2017, and the service was taken over by a new Community Interest Company Going Forward Buses, based in Goring.

== Gallery ==
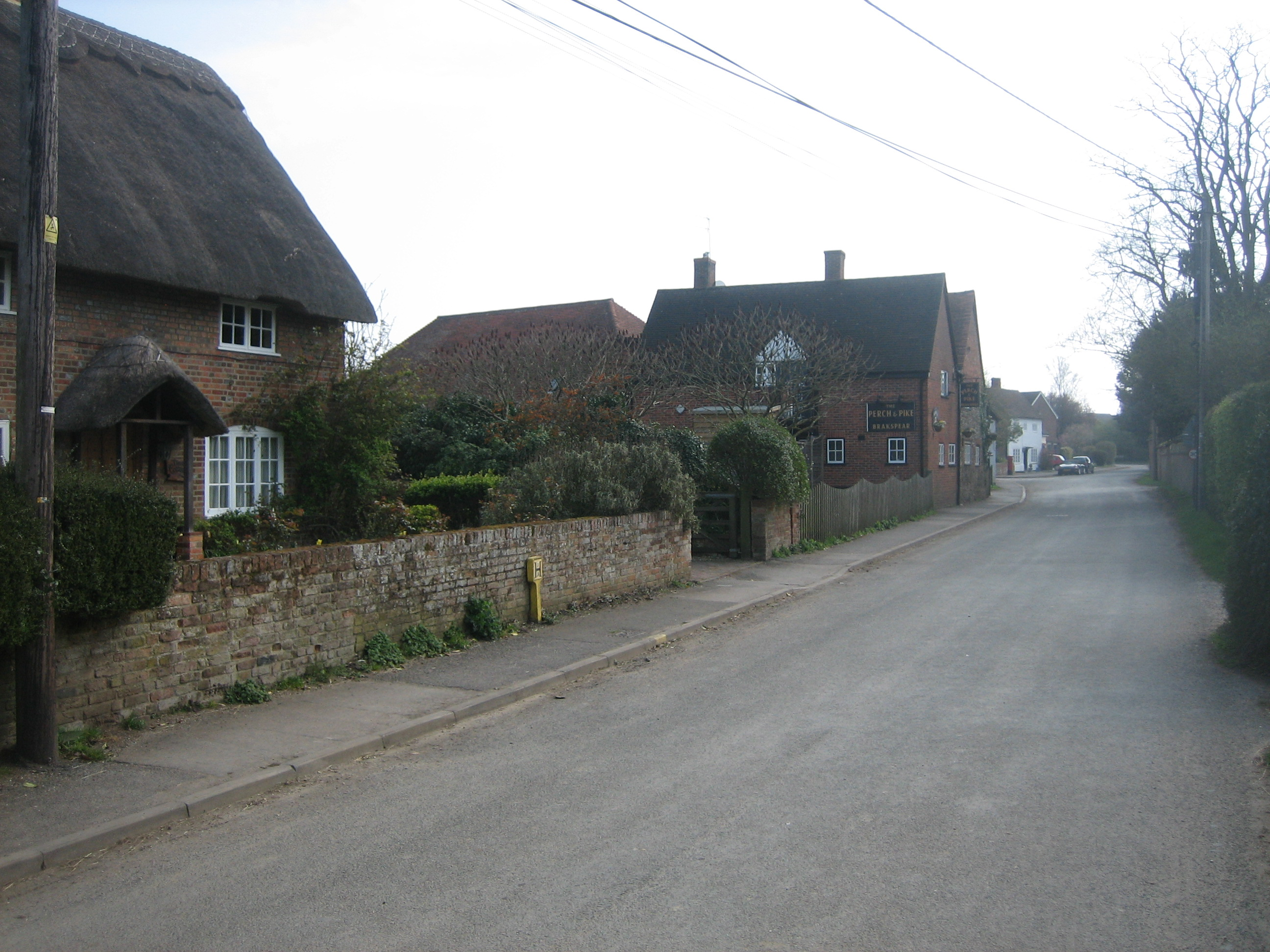
South Stoke

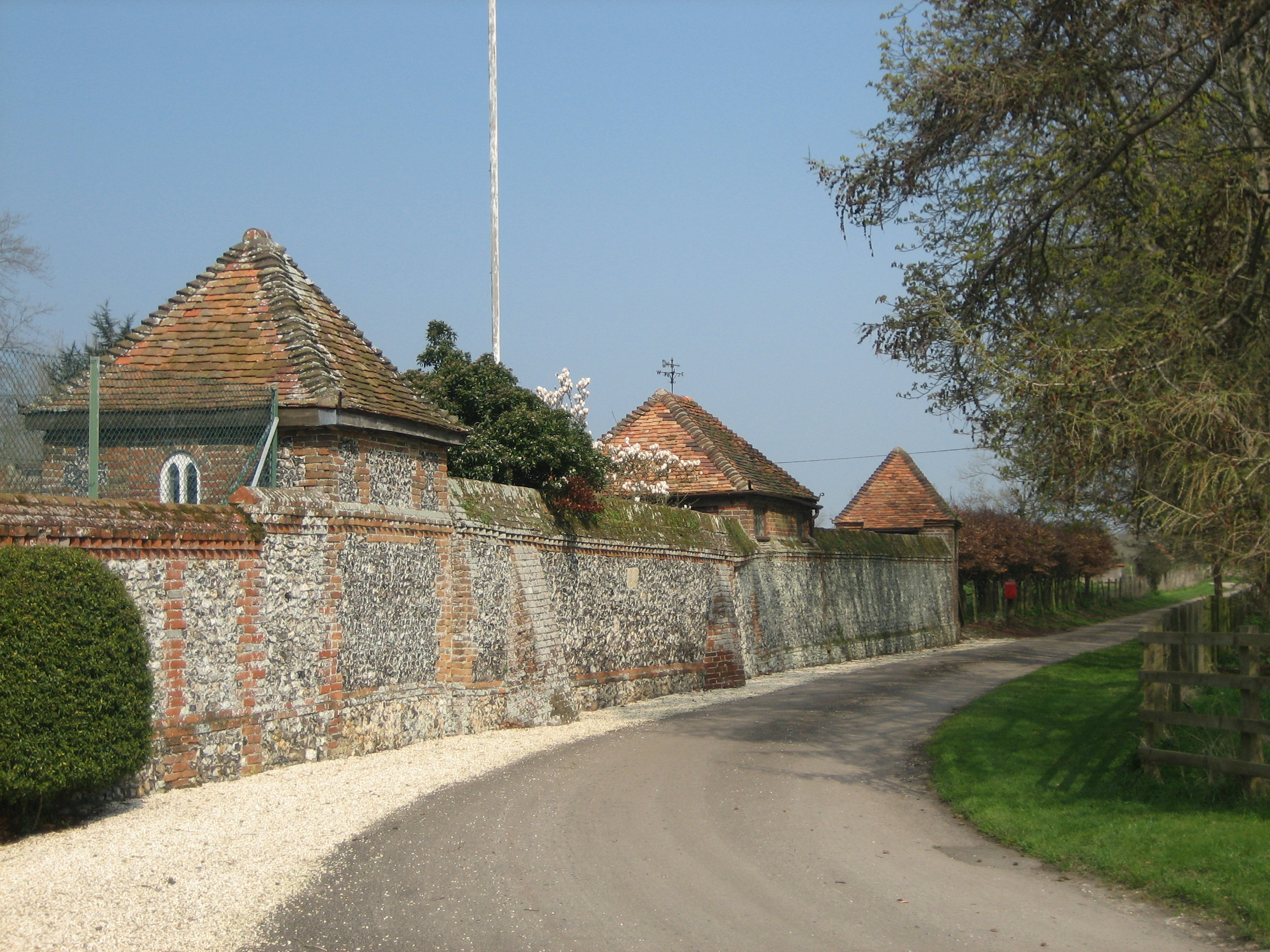
Little Stoke

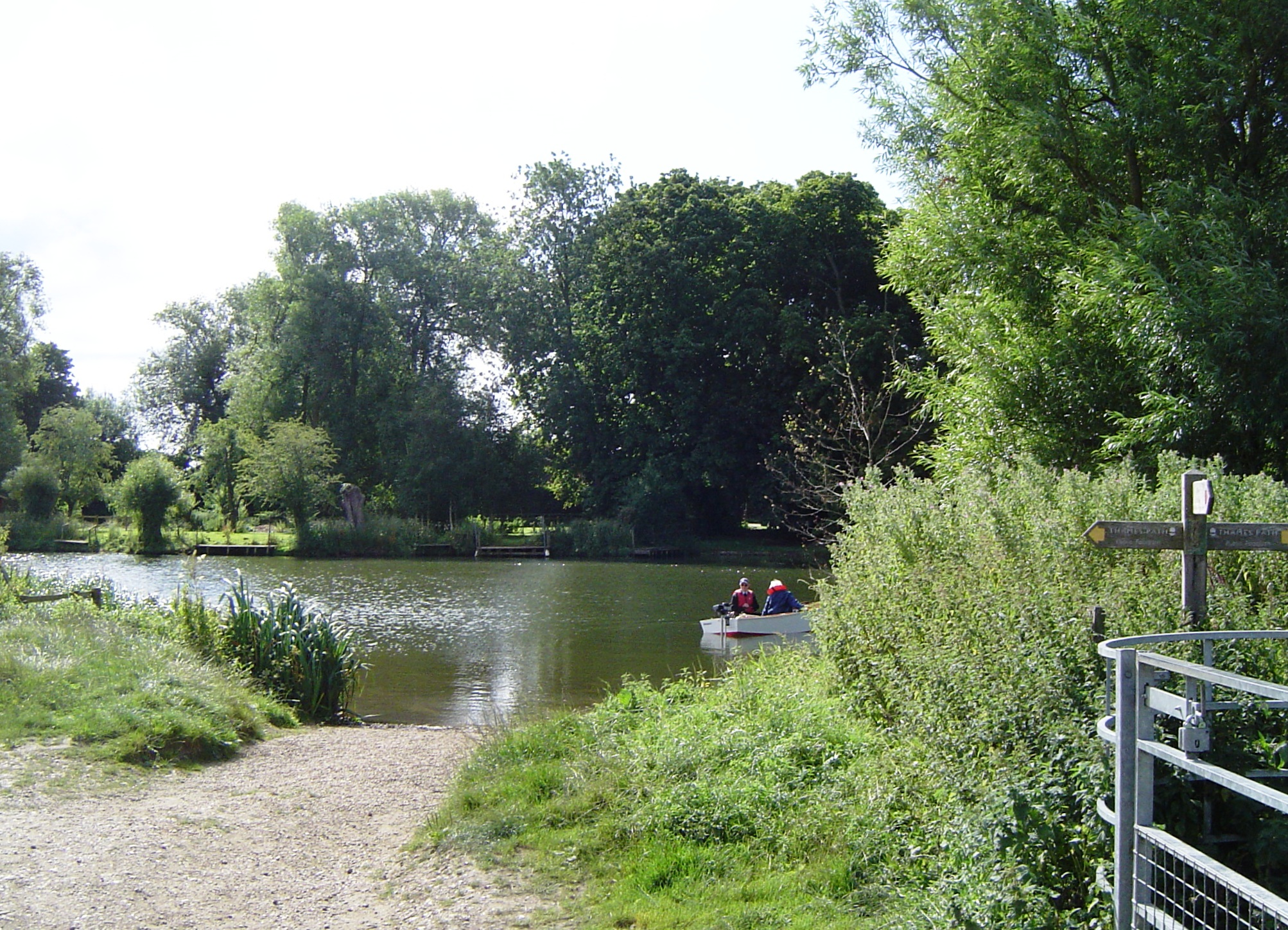
Site of Little Stoke ferry from the Cholsey side

== Sources ==
- Brodie, Antonia; Felstead, Alison; Franklin, Jonathan; Pinfield, Leslie; Oldfield, Jane, eds. (2001). Directory of British Architects 1834–1914, A–K. London & New York: Continuum. p. 375. ISBN 0-8264-5513-1.
- Emery, Frank (1974). The Oxfordshire Landscape. The Making of the English Landscape. London: Hodder & Stoughton. p. 96. ISBN 0-340-04301-6.
- Lobel, Mary D, ed. (1962). A History of the County of Oxford: Volume 7: Thame and Dorchester Hundreds. Victoria County History. pp. 93–112.
- Sherwood, Jennifer; Pevsner, Nikolaus (1974). Oxfordshire. The Buildings of England. Harmondsworth: Penguin Books. pp. 773–774. ISBN 0-14-071045-0.
