= Langtree School =

Coordinates: 51.5330°N 1.0682°W

Location
- Reading Road; Woodcote, Oxfordshire, RG8 0RA; England

Information
- Type: Academy
- Motto: Putting Learning First
- Established: c. 1708
- Local authority: Oxfordshire County Council
- Department for Education URN: 137976 Tables
- Ofsted: Reports
- Headteacher: Simon Bamford
- Gender: Coeducational
- Age: 11 to 16
- Colours: Navy, white
- Website: www.langtreeschool.com

View of Langtree School, Woodcote, Oxfordshire.

Langtree School is a coeducational secondary school located in the village of Woodcote in South Oxfordshire, England. The school has approximately 624 students and a team of around 55 teachers and support staff. It became a DfES Specialist Performing Arts College in 2006.

Previously a community school administered by Oxfordshire County Council, in April 2012 Langtree School converted to academy status.

The school was inspected by Ofsted in 2023, and was graded good.

== History ==
The first records of a Sunday school in Woodcote hamlet date back to as early as 1708, and a day school was established in 1715. In 1878 the school became a Board school; it was closed in 1899 and a new school was built to hold 120 children. It existed up to 1957 as a mixed County School, and was then reorganised as Langtree Secondary School.
