= Madley Park =

Coordinates: 51.792°N 1.465°W

Location of Madley Park in Oxfordshire

Madley Park is a district on Madley Brook, a small tributary of the River Windrush in Witney, Oxfordshire. It comprises housing, schools and a community centre.

== History ==
Construction work of the area began in 2001 and continued until 2007. The Madley Brook Primary School and Springfield School were both completed in 2003, as well as playing fields and a swimming pool. In 2011, Madley Park community hall was opened to residents.

== Location ==
Madley Park is located off of the A4095 in North East Witney, alongside the Wood Green School, situated within the historic boundary of South Leigh.
