= Bulmershe College =

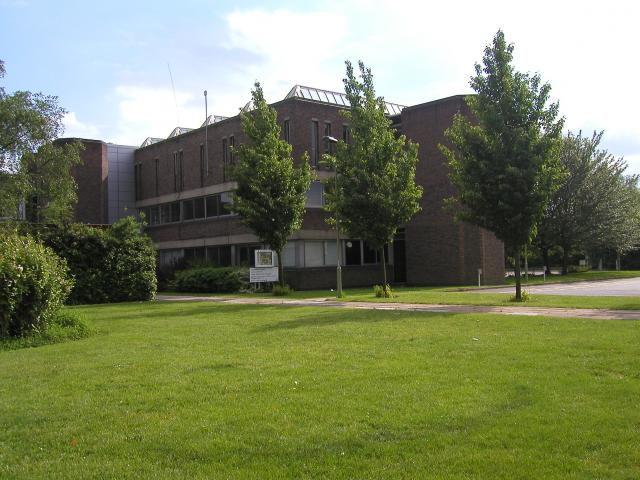
- Bulmershe College (now demolished)

Location
- Reading, Berkshire; England; 51°27′14″N 0°57′17″W

Information
- Type: Further education
- Established: 1964
- Closed: 1989
- Local authority: Reading
- Gender: Mixed

Bulmershe College was an education institution in the Reading suburb of Woodley, in the English county of Berkshire. Bulmershe College opened for teaching in 1964 but merged with the University of Reading in 1989 to create the Bulmershe Court campus. Following the closure of this campus in 2012, the educational buildings on the site have now been demolished, and the site is now a residential development.

The college was built on the site of Woodley House, also known as Bulmershe Court, which was demolished in 1962 to make way for the college, and gave its name to the later university campus. This is a separate site from the Grade II* listed Bulmershe Manor, also known as Old Bulmershe Court, which still stands some way to the north east.

== History ==
=== Origins ===
Bulmershe first appears in existing records in the 12th century as a place in the parish of Sonning. The first reference to it as a manor was in 1447 when it was granted to Reading Abbey. After the Dissolution of the Monasteries, the land was acquired by the poet William Gray. He probably built the first house here, the remains of which may be the basis of the present Bulmershe Manor.

William Gray's wife, Agnes, was the widow of Robert Blagrave, a merchant of London and Reading and their son, John was Gray's heir. Through this the Blagrave family came to own Bulmershe Court, although both John Blagrave the mathematician and Daniel Blagrave the regicide resided at the family's other residence, at Southcote House in what is now the Reading suburb of Southcote.

The main branch of the Blagrave family died out in 1789, and the estate was sold to Henry Addington, then Speaker of the House of Commons. At the same time he purchased the adjoining Woodley House, which had been built some seven years earlier.

Addington preferred to live in the more modern structure, and in time the name Bulmershe Court transferred over to that building. The earlier Bulmershe Court became known as Old Bulmershe Court. For a time it fell into disrepair, but was restored in the 1920s and renamed Bulmershe Manor. Bulmershe Manor is a Grade II* listed building.

=== Becoming an educational establishment ===
The newer Bulmershe Court was used by the War Office during World War II, but was pulled down in 1962 to make way for an educational establishment called Bulmershe College of Education which opened two years later. Tom Hollis the first principal would not take students straight from school for the first two years. His successor was James Porter, who went on to be Director of the Commonwealth Institute, London. Principally a centre for Teacher Training, the institution later broadened by offering a range of higher education courses validated by the now defunct Council for National Academic Awards (CNAA). It became Berkshire College of Education in 1975, awarding its own degrees two years later.

=== Merger with the University of Reading ===
Finding itself facing extreme financial pressure as part of a national education funding squeeze at the latter days of the Thatcher government (under Keith Joseph, Kenneth Baker, and others), the future of the college (and others in a similar position) then became doubtful. Principal Brian Palmer led a widespread study of all available options (including a drastic cutback of its expanded provision) and after these had been fully investigated, Bulmershe then merged with the University of Reading in 1989. This created the Bulmershe Court campus of the university. The merger secured its funding and thus safeguarded a large number of its courses and staff, both academic and administrative, for the next few years.

The campus was sold by the University of Reading in January 2014, as the university had earlier decided to concentrate its activity on its three other campuses. Reading moved all teaching and research at Bulmershe either to Whiteknights or to London Road by 2011/12, having invested in new buildings several years previously, and closed the student accommodation. There was a "Farewell to Bulmershe" event in 2011 for alumni of the institutions before and after the merger.

== Academic profile ==
=== Courses and subjects ===
As Bulmershe College of Higher Education (BCHE), alongside existing BEd and other education qualifications (such as the PGCE), the new establishment ran a range of BA Honours courses in humanities subjects such as History, Geography, and English.

The American Studies programme ran a regular exchange with students in America's Lock Haven University of Pennsylvania. Students at Boston University also regularly visited campus as part of an established exchange programme.

Courses in Modern European Literature and Film and Drama Studies were especially prestigious. Film director Richard Kwietniowski taught on the latter course during the mid-1980s, as did one-time Channel Four Commissioning Editor Stuart Cosgrove, and the feminist film academic Laura Mulvey.

The college also housed a permanent writer-in-residence, Sue Krisman, author of 'Ducks and Drakes', who ran courses for students in creative writing.

The college played host to a wide variety of disparate student communities:

- The long-standing Education degree courses attracted a large body of sports players and followers, and those of a competitive nature.
- Its newly added Arts and Humanities faculty appealed to a large number of mature students from the immediate local community, especially women.
- The theatre, drama, and film strand recruited those with creative flair who had their sights set on careers in the performing arts.
- Community and Social Work studies (including the CQSW and C&Y courses) were attended by a significant body of black students

=== Catering for students with disabilities ===
Bulmershe prided itself on its accessibility for students with disabilities, and offered specially adapted residential hostel accommodation. The offices of the Bulmershe Resource Centre for the Handicapped (BReCH) were sited on campus for several years.

With the support of Principal Harold Silver (1978–86), the college also then became a locus for a wide range of activities related to the deaf community. Within a space of a few years, it offered a Theatre of the Deaf course of study, housed offices for both the Berkshire Consortium Support Services and the national charity Friends for the Young Deaf Trust (FYD), and was home to the first-ever profoundly deaf Student Union President, Craig Crowley.

== Student life ==
=== The student experience ===
Student social life largely revolved – as in most campuses – around eating and drinking. The formal student refectory (for those living in hall) was supplemented by a pay-as-you-eat canteen affectionately known to all as 'Chip City'. And the Union bar was the scene for many promotion events, perhaps the most notorious being the regular Foster's nights.

=== The Students' Union (BCHESU) ===
Alongside a managing interest in the bar (whose 'Landlord' was actually a college employee), the Bulmershe Students' Union provided a shop to meet every student need. Dee's Shop was a significant landmark on campus. And the weekly freesheet 'Bulletin', edited and produced by the Student Union (and at one stage by TV writer and Dr Who author Colin Brake), kept everyone up-to-date with news, events and gossip.

Large scale events had two main origins. Firstly, theatre students were required to stage performances as part of their assessment and examinations, and these were annually open to audiences gathered from across the student body. In addition, the official College Production, directed by a member of staff, was mounted yearly, with cast and crew consisting of all students who volunteered to play a part.

College productions

- 1982 Days of the Commune – by Bertolt Brecht
- 1983 The Trojan Women – by Euripides
- 1984 Hotel Paradiso

Secondly, regular Students Balls were held throughout the academic year, principally for Freshers, at Christmas, for Valentine's Day, Rag Week, and in the Summer. Artists were many and varied, with soul legend Geno Washington performing, and at one stage included Cockney Rebel and Dr Feelgood in the 1970s and pop band Erasure, who played at Bulmershe in the run up to their big charts successes in the 1980s. Another well known band to play at Bulmershe was The Levellers who played the summer ball in 1988.

== Student politics ==
BCHESU was structured as many unions affiliated to the National Union of Students (NUS). It had a written constitution to govern its affairs, and an executive committee to run day-to-day business, headed by two paid employees: the president and deputy president. In addition to the shop manager, BCHESU also had two other members of staff on the payroll – a financial manager to oversee the annual budget, and an office secretary.

Like much of student politics in the 1980s, BCHESU discussion and debate was heavily influenced by the Thatcher government and its policies, both in education and beyond. As part of the many clubs and societies funded from its budget, the Socialist Society came to prominence and galvanised and divided opinion across campus. A sustained and organised campaign led to significant success in the elections for the 1984–85 Executive Committee but this was then challenged during proposals to donate union monies to the striking miners. (The legality of giving money to causes beyond the immediate concern of students – known as 'ultra vires' payments – became a prime concern for student politics nationally at this time). The proposals fell, leading to the wholesale resignation of Socialist Society members of the Executive, including the president.

Aside from party politics, student debate was also fuelled by the disparate nature of the many, quite separate, communities on campus. Tensions between these communities led to two significant events in the life of Bulmershe, leading to formal investigations and reports by the college authorities.

The first revolved around the annual Christmas revue show called Big Als, which at one stage fell foul of a serious allegation of homophobia. The well-established brash and bawdy event suddenly became a catalyst for the differences that existed between the sporting community, who owned the show, and the drama students who were, by their nature, responsible for every other performance at the college except this one.

The second took place during one year's traditional Rag Week events, and concerned an allegation of racism. Again, it seemed that a large part of the background to the event was the obvious but unspoken tension between the largely white main student body and those black students studying Social Work and Community and Youth work courses. The two groups were almost actively prevented from any significant integration by the logistics of the college – the professional courses were run in a distinct part of the campus, on a timetable at odds with the rest of college life, and attracting existing workers whose day-to-day experience was completely different from that of any other Bulmershe student.

== Alumni and notable former staff ==
- Pippa Ailion, MBE, West End Casting director, theatrical director
- Timandra Harkness, writer, presenter and comedian
- Richard Kwietniowski, film director
- Alan Clayson, musician and author
- Laura Mulvey, lecturer at Bulmershe 1978–1982 and Professor of Film and Media Studies, Birkbeck College, University of London
- Stuart Cosgrove, Scottish journalist, broadcaster and television executive (Channel 4)
- Eric Parkin, pianist
- Victor Perkins, film critic and author of Film as Film (1972). Lecturer at Bulmershe.
- Annie Castledine, former teacher.
- Gwyn Arch MBE: musical director at the college, also a composer and choirmaster
