= Checkendon =

Village and civil parish in England

Coordinates: 51.543°N 1.046°W

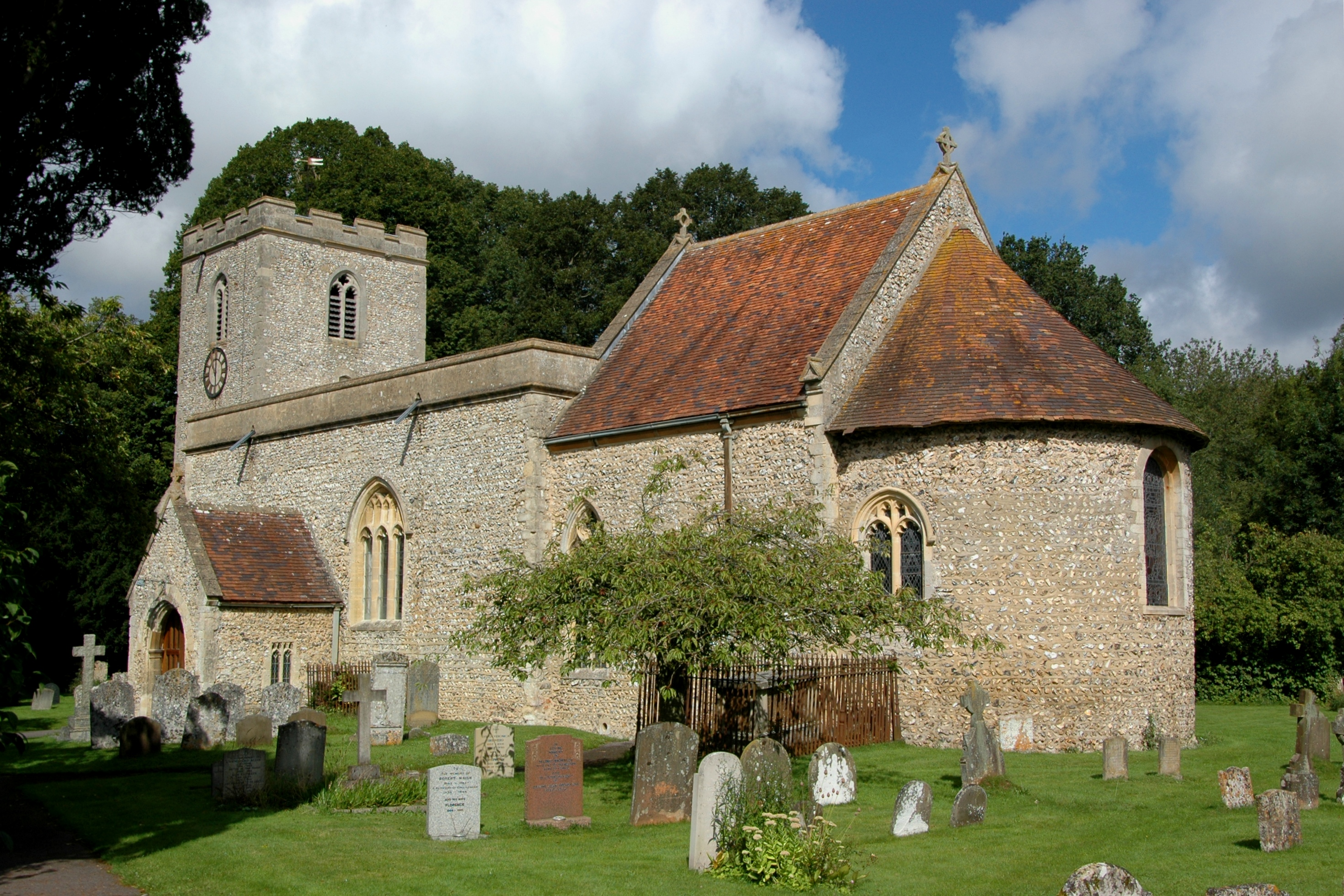
- Parish church of Saints Peter and Paul

- Location within Oxfordshire
- Area: 9.85 km^{2} (3.80 sq mi)
- Population: 493 (2011 census)
  - Density: 50/km^{2} (130/sq mi)
- OS grid reference: SU6683
- Civil parish: Checkendon
- District: South Oxfordshire
- Shire county: Oxfordshire
- Region: South East
- Country: England
- Sovereign state: United Kingdom
- Post town: Reading
- Postcode district: RG8
- Dialling code: 01491
- Police: Thames Valley
- Fire: Oxfordshire
- Ambulance: South Central
- UK Parliament: Henley and Thame

Checkendon is a village and civil parish about 6 miles (10 km) west of Henley-on-Thames in South Oxfordshire and about 9 miles (14 km) north west of Reading in Berkshire on a mid-height swathe of the Chilterns.

== History ==
The parish records exist from the 7th century. The village is listed in the Domesday Book of 1086 as Cecadene (Old English for "Ceaca's hill or hill-pasture"). The parish covers about 1,500 hectares (3,700 acres) and lies between 150 metres (490 ft) and 170 metres (560 ft) above sea level. After World War II Checkendon hosted a National Assistance Board camp for Polish war refugees displaced from Middle East and Africa, called Checkendon Polish Resettlement Hostel or "Checkendon Camp". The camp, located on the outskirts of Checkendon, was opened in 1948 and offered accommodation in Nissen huts. It was closed in the early 1960s.

== Parish church ==
The Church of England parish church of Saint Peter and Saint Paul is a 12th-century Norman building. All but one of the windows were replaced later in the Middle Ages with Decorated Gothic and Perpendicular Gothic ones, and the Perpendicular Gothic west tower is also a later addition. The building is Grade I listed. The church has an early 13th-century wall painting of Christ in Majesty above a procession of Apostles. The murals were faithfully repainted when they were rediscovered, but more recently this has been considered over-restoration.

The bell tower has a ring of eight bells. Four were cast by Lester and Pack of the Whitechapel Bell Foundry in 1765, two were cast in 1879 by Mears and Stainbank also of the Whitechapel Bell Foundry and two more also cast by Mears and Stainbank were added in 1967. The turret clock is by Tucker of London, dated 1853. Saint Peter and Saint Paul parish is now a member of The Langtree Team Ministry: a Church of England benefice that also includes the parishes of Ipsden, North Stoke, Stoke Row, Whitchurch-on-Thames and Woodcote. The war artist Eric Kennington (1888–1960), who was churchwarden, is buried here.

== Amenities ==
Checkendon has a Church of England primary school. Checkendon also has a village green with a playground. The village had two pubs: the 15th-century Four Horseshoes within the village and the 17th-century Highwayman to the south in the nearby hamlet of Exlade Street. The Four Horseshoes closed and in 2014 the landlord Brakspear was given permission to convert the pub into a post office. This never transpired, however, and in 2018 the pub company successfully applied to convert the property into residential accommodation. The property was eventually sold in January 2022.

There is also the Black Horse public house at Scots Common. Checkendon has an equestrian centre located on Lovegroves Lane. Checkendon Cricket Club plays in the Berkshire Cricket League First Division.

North of the village, in the 19th-century Wheelers Barn, is Philip Koomen Furniture, producing modern bespoke wooden furniture. The Hook End Recording Studios, where bands such as Marillion, the Cure and the Manic Street Preachers have made albums, are in the manor house at nearby Hook End. Near the edge of the village, on public display, is the statue Nuba Survival by John Buckley, created in 2001.

== Public transport ==
No bus routes serve Checkendon: The nearest bus services are found in Woodcote.

== Notable people ==
- Nicholas Vladimir Polunin (1909–1997) botanist, environmentalist, arctic explorer and writer; born in Checkendon to Vladimir Polunin, a Russian scenographer, set designer and educator, and his mother Elizabeth Polunin (née Hart; 1887–1950), a British artist and theatre designer.

== Gallery ==
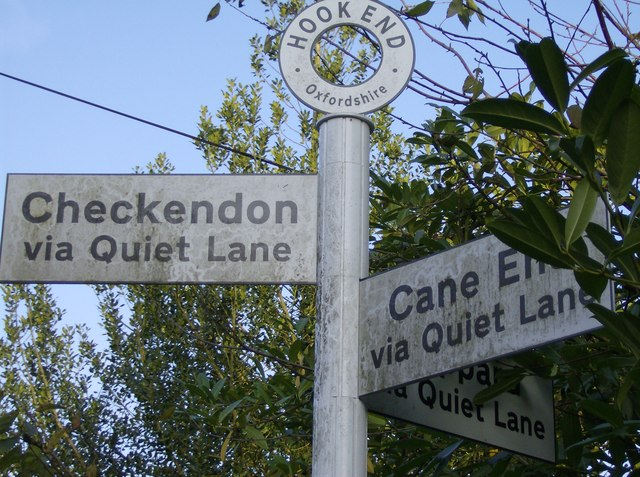
Perplexing signpost at Hookend

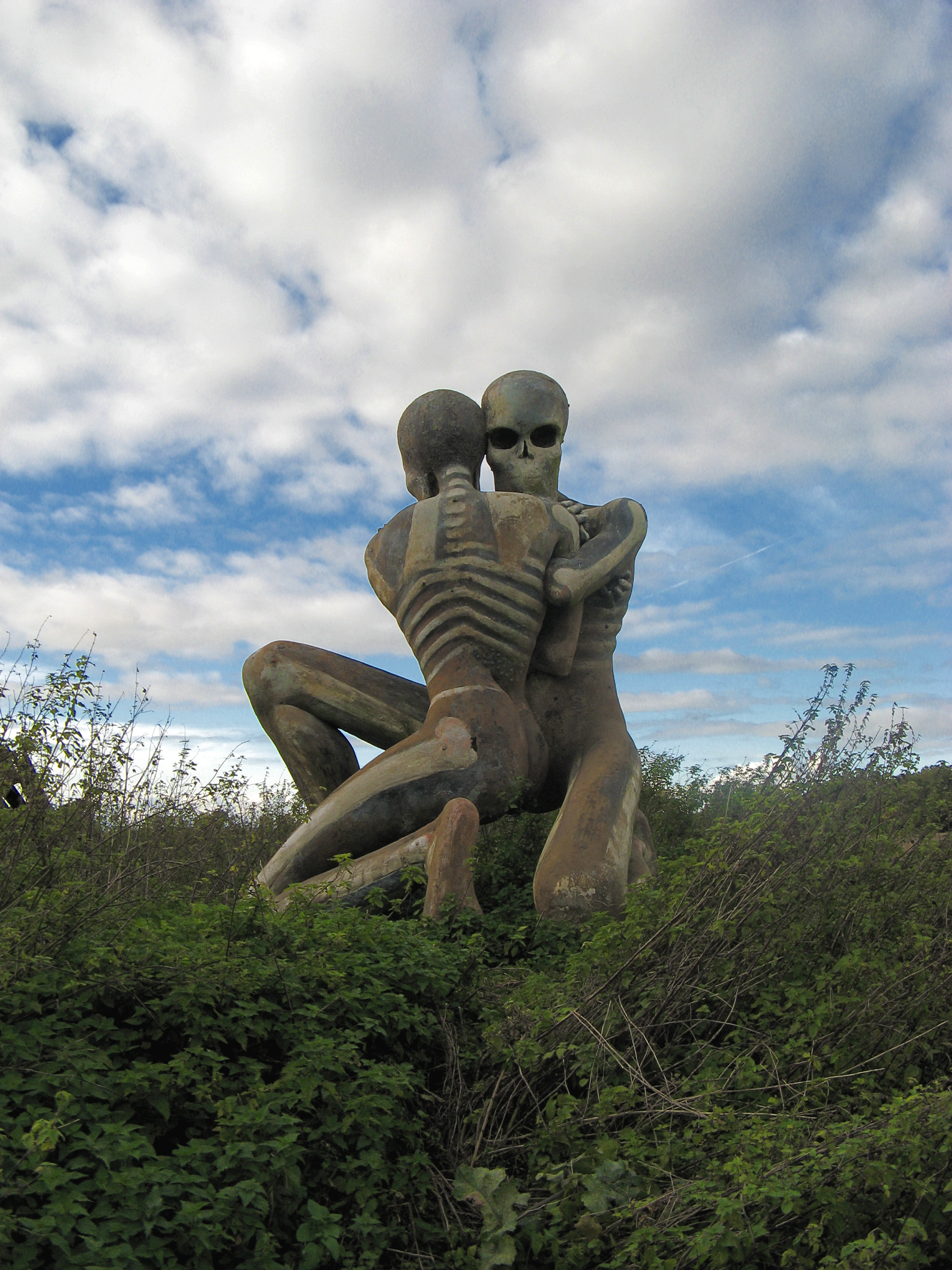
Nuba Survival by John Buckley (2001)

== Sources ==
- Long, E.T. (1972). "Medieval Wall Paintings in Oxfordshire Churches". Oxoniensia. XXXVII. Oxfordshire Architectural and Historical Society: 106–107.
- Sherwood, Jennifer; Pevsner, Nikolaus (1974). Oxfordshire. The Buildings of England. Harmondsworth: Penguin Books. pp. 533–534. ISBN 0-14-071045-0.
