= Health forecasting =

Prediction of risks to human health based on weather conditions

Health forecasting is a new health care discipline initiated by the Met Office when Dr William Bird, a GP, became its first clinical director in 2002. It is currently the subject of an innovative project run jointly by the Met Office and the National Health Service (NHS) in the United Kingdom.

The natural environment affects human health. There are many cases in which the weather has a direct or indirect effect on the health of an individual. These include:

- Heat, which can cause up to a 30% increase in mortality amongst the elderly and very young. Prevention can save lives.
- Cold, which contributes to 30–40 thousand deaths each winter. Prevention consists of keeping active, eating well, dressing up appropriately, especially hat, gloves and coat when outside and keeping the indoor temperature at 21C.
- Thunderstorms, which can cause asthma epidemics if they occur during high levels of either pollen or fungal spores in the summer.
- Low boundary layers, which may increase the way viruses are transmitted by increasing the amount of stagnant air.

Health forecasts help professionals and patients know when and where there is a risk of illness. Through this understanding, preventative action can be taken and health care capacity (i.e. hospitals and doctors) managed to reduce illness and death.

The main strand of the health forecasting project is forecasting the risk of exacerbation for people with chronic obstructive pulmonary disease (COPD). COPD health forecasts are used to drive the provision of anticipatory care to people with COPD, helping them achieve their potential for independence and wellbeing. The service is being run in around 30 primary care trusts with over 20,000 patient registered to receive alerts. In many areas alerts are provided by an automated interactive telephone. Evidence from several evaluations of the service has shown around a 20% reduction in COPD related emergency admissions for practices using the service.

On 26 February 2007, the project won in the Innovative Service Award category at the Health and Social Care Awards 2006. The Health and Social Care Awards are run annually in partnership between the Department of Health and the NHS Institute for Innovation and Improvement and are the most important opportunity within the NHS and social care to identify, recognise and reward excellence in the provision of care at the front line. The specific award recognises an innovative, new or improved service that is benefiting the delivery of health care for patients, users and carers.

In 2011 the Shanghai Meteorological Service and Shanghai Municipal Public Health Bureau jointly launched a health meteorological service that includes health forecasting for conditions such as colds, asthma, COPD and a heat health warning service. This will be developed based on a considerable amount of research to provide a service to improve healthcare in Shanghai.
