= Heyford Park School =

Location
- 74 Camp Road, Heyford Park; Bicester, OX25 5HD; England
- Coordinates: 51°55′40″N 1°15′52″W

Information
- Type: school
- Established: 2020; 6 years ago
- Local authority: Oxfordshire
- Department for Education URN: 148353 Tables
- Ofsted: Reports
- Chair of Governors: Jenny Faulkner
- Executive head primary: Sarah Nickelson
- Executive head secondary: Craig Thomas
- Gender: Coeducational
- Age: 3 to 19
- Enrolment: 584
- Website: heyfordparkschool.org

Heyford Park School is a free school in Upper Heyford, England. The school was opened in November 2020 after the Heyford Park Free School was closed in September 2020. In the school's most recent inspection (October 2023) Ofsted rated it as good. The school is a part of the Eynsham Partnership Academy Trust.

== History ==
Heyford Park School was originally established as Heyford Park Free School in September 2013. After receiving an Ofsted rating of inadequate in September 2019, the school closed and reopened as Heyford Park School, joining the Eynsham Partnership Academy Trust.

The school was built on an old US Air Force base, which was originally an RAF bomber station, and utilises a lot of the buildings of the base.
