= Blessed George Napier Catholic School =

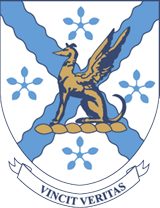

Location
- Addison Road; Banbury, Oxfordshire, OX16 9DG; England; 52°02′55″N 1°14′28″W

Information
- Type: Academy
- Motto: Vincit veritas Truth conquers
- Religious affiliation: Catholic Church
- Department for Education URN: 141146 Tables
- Ofsted: Reports
- Chair of Board of Directors: Anita Mutton
- Headteacher: Sean Masterson
- Chief Executive Officer: Fraser Long
- Gender: Coeducational
- Age: 11 to 18
- Enrolment: 1000
- Houses: Assisi; Bakhita; Calcutta; Edith Stein; Faustyna
- Colours: Blue and yellow
- Website: blessedgeorgenapier.co.uk

Blessed George Napier Catholic School, known locally as BGN, is a Catholic secondary school and sixth form with academy status. It is located on Addison Road in the Easington ward of Banbury, Oxfordshire, England.

== Foundation ==
The school is named "Blessed George Napier" after George Napper (Napier), who is the patron of the school, and there are memorial plaques on the outside of the school, depicting his life and death. BGN is one of only two Catholic schools offering secondary education in Oxfordshire, the other one being Greyfriars Catholic School in Oxford. Previously a voluntary aided school administered by Oxfordshire County Council and Roman Catholic Archdiocese of Birmingham, Blessed George Napier Roman Catholic School converted to academy status on 1 August 2014, as part of the Pope Francis Multi Academy Company (PFMAC). However the school continues to coordinate with Oxfordshire County Council for admissions.

== Facilities ==
The school has three main buildings, one of which is named the Corrigan building after Monsignor Corrigan, two outbuildings, including a Sports Centre, an Astroturf court at the rear and an on-site Chapel, with stained glass windows depicting the life and death of the School's Patron, Blessed George Napier, as well as one Portakabin as classrooms. The Sports Centre is named the "Monsi" after Monsignor Corrigan, a long-serving chair of governors. The newest building, the Dupuis Building, houses science laboratories and maths classrooms. The site also includes an assembly hall called the "Rachel Smith" hall in memory of former Head of Religious Education, Rachel Smith who died in 2022 from cancer.

The school has approximately 1000 students in the 11–18 age range, including a sixth form. In the past, BGN has won awards for its school meals catering.

== Headteachers ==
There has been seven Headteachers of Blessed George Napier since it opened in 1962.

- George Grimshaw (1962 - 1973)
- Terry O’Flynn (1973 - 1994)
- David Dawson (1994 - 2006)
- Catherine Weaver (2006 - 2011)
- Fraser Long (2011-2020)
- Niamh Dolan (2020-2025)
- Sean Masterson (2025–present)
