= Bulmershe Court =

Former campus of the University of Reading

Coordinates: 51°26′59.24″N 0°55′22.86″W

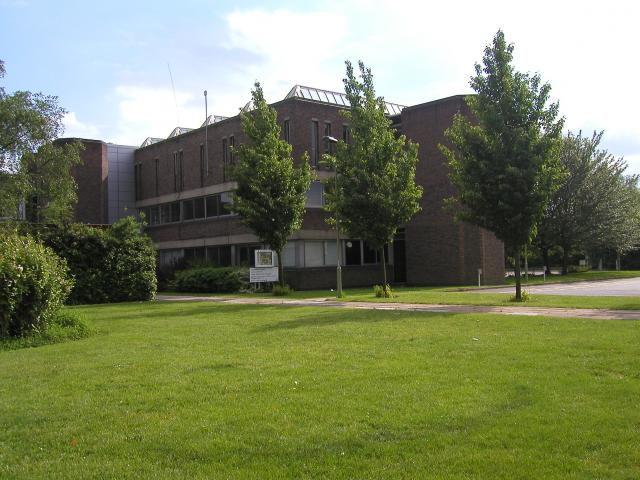
Bulmershe Court (now demolished)

Bulmershe Court was a campus of the University of Reading, situated in the Reading suburb of Woodley, in the English county of Berkshire.

The site first opened for teaching in 1964 as Bulmershe College, which merged with the University of Reading in 1989 to create the Bulmershe Court campus. The campus closed in 2012 and all its activities were moved to either the London Road Campus or Whiteknights Park. In December 2013, the site was acquired for a residential development, and the existing buildings on the site were then largely demolished following a fire. The residential development was completed in 2018.

== Name ==
The name "Bulmershe Court" originally belonged to the Grade II* listed Bulmershe Manor (or Old Bulmershe Court), a separate house which still stands some way to the north east of the former campus site. Subsequently, the name "Bulmershe Court" came to be applied to Woodley House, the house which was demolished in 1962 to make way for Bulmershe College, which became the campus of Bulmershe Court upon becoming part of the University of Reading in 1989.

== Campus ==
=== Academic profile ===
Bulmershe College became the Bulmershe Court Campus of the University of Reading in 1989, housing its Faculty of Education (later Institute of Education) and Community Studies (later School of Health and Social Care). It continued to offer courses in education, community studies, social work, and film, theatre and television studies until 2011/12.

=== Buildings ===
Original buildings were retained and updated, including a £1 million refurbishment of the existing Bob Kayley Studio building (named after the first Head of Film and Drama at Bulmershe College) into a fully fitted 90 seater theatre also open to the public.

The former Bridges Hall space was converted into a lecture theatre, and several new student halls of residence were built on the site as part of Bulmershe Hall.

The campus was made up of many different buildings, some of those being accommodation retained from the original Bulmershe College – including Mitford, Penn, Winchcombe and Blagrave – and some newly built on merger with the university, including Hollins and Huntley. One of the original halls continued to bear the name Blagrave in testament to the long history of buildings on the site.

The refurbished Bob Kayley Studio (referred to above) saw its last performance in December 2010. Courses in Film and Drama Studies were being moved to the main Whiteknights campus and to a new purpose-built home – the Minghella Building – named after the late film director Anthony Minghella, who was made an Honorary Professor of the university in 2006 before his death.

=== Closure ===
Financial pressures faced by the University of Reading after the 2008 financial crisis, and the usual university re-organisations, meant that from 2010 there had been uncertainty about the fate of accommodation and teaching on the campus. With the end of teaching and most accommodation in 2011 the university set about redeveloping the site for housing and an old peoples' care home. The Library was moved to Whiteknights.

Social work programmes ended in September 2011. Courses were transferred to the University of West London (formerly Thames Valley University), who operate them from a Reading site in Crescent Road (previously the home of the Reading College of Technology).

All activity on the Bulmershe Campus ended in 2012 apart from use of the playing fields. Institute of Education courses were relocated to completely refurbished University buildings based at the London Road campus in 2012. By 2013, all education activity has ceased and some buildings yet to be demolished were offered for temporary commercial rental.

=== Re-development ===
University plans changed again and on 23 December 2013, Cala Homes acquired the site for a residential development of 290 dwellings. It was announced that the newer halls would be converted to residential flats, and that much of the rest would be demolished. On 25 December 2013 Bulmershe Court hall of residence burnt down and later demolished. The residential development was completed in 2018.
