= Woodcote =

Village in Oxfordshire, England

Coordinates: 51.534°N 1.072°W

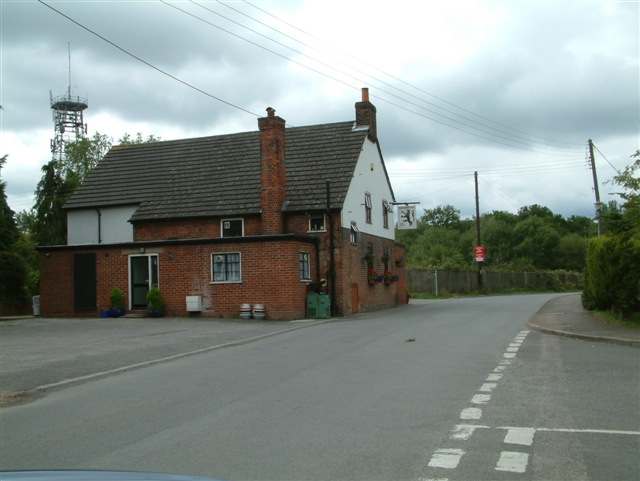
- The Black Lion, Woodcote

- Location within Oxfordshire
- Area: 7.11 km^{2} (2.75 sq mi)
- Population: 2,715 (2001 census)
  - Density: 382/km^{2} (990/sq mi)
- OS grid reference: SU6481
- Civil parish: Woodcote
- District: South Oxfordshire
- Shire county: Oxfordshire
- Region: South East
- Country: England
- Sovereign state: United Kingdom
- Post town: Reading
- Postcode district: RG8
- Dialling code: 01491
- Police: Thames Valley
- Fire: Oxfordshire
- Ambulance: South Central
- UK Parliament: Henley and Thame
- Website: Welcome to Woodcote

Woodcote is a village and civil parish in the South Oxfordshire district, in Oxfordshire, England, about 5 miles (8 km) southeast of Wallingford and about 7 miles (11 km) northwest of Reading. It is in the Chiltern Hills, and the highest part of the village is 600 feet (180 m) above sea level. Woodcote lies between the Goring Road and the A4074. It is centred on the village green and Church Farm, with the village hall centred on the crossroads. In 2001 the parish had a population of 2715.

== History ==
Prehistoric artefacts have been found in the area, including a polished hand-axe from about 3000 BC found in the nearby hamlet of Exlade Street and on show in Reading Museum and a 28 cm carved stone head Romano-Celtic, probably 1st–2nd century, with typical protruding eyes, exaggerated lips and flattened nose. The folds of skin on the neck and musculature at the back of the head have been carefully detailed. It is of white oolite limestone, and was found at Wayside Green, Woodcote, and is now in Reading Museum (Ref 401-78).

The toponym Woodcote means "cottage in the wood". Woodcote was first documented in 1109, when it was a dependent settlement of South Stoke, which in turn was a possession of Eynsham Abbey. At the time of the Hundred Rolls in 1279, Woodcote had 14 freeholders and 20 tenants. Woodcote's population grew thereafter but then declined, perhaps as a result of the Black Death. In 1366 as a result of depopulation 15 virgates of land at Woodcote were vacant. Woodcote Manor may date from the 12th century. In 1550 it was called Rawlins Manor. There is a Jacobean barn in the grounds of Woodcote House. Woodcote House itself is a Georgian country house built in 1733. It was remodelled by the architect Detmar Blow in 1910. Since 1942 it has been the premises of The Oratory School, a Roman Catholic day and boarding independent school.

Woodcote used to hold an annual sheep fair on the first Monday after St Leonard's Day (6 November). The earliest known record of it is from early in the 18th century, but the link with the feast day of the parish's patron saint suggests the fair may have begun in the Middle Ages. The fair was still being held in 1852. Woodcote farmed largely on an open field system with five open fields until 1853, when an Act of Parliament enabled an enclosure award for South Stoke and Woodcote. Woodcote provided the common pasture for the whole of South Stoke parish, while South Stoke beside the River Thames provided most of the parish's hay meadow. In the 20th century Woodcote outgrew South Stoke. By 1920 most residents worked outside the parish, many commuting to either Reading or an RAF station at Goring Heath. Woodcote won the Oxfordshire Village of the Year title for 2008.

== Churches ==
By 1406 the parish of St. Andrew, South Stoke had at Woodcote a dependent chapel that served both Woodcote and Exlade Street. The chapel was dedicated to St. Leonard and there is a record from 1467 of John Chadworth, Bishop of Lincoln, issuing a licence for services at it. Architectural evidence suggests that the chapel, which had an apsidal chancel, was much older and probably dated from the 12th century. In 1845–46 St. Leonard's was rebuilt to the designs of the Gothic Revival architect H.J. Underwood. Of the original building little survives except the outer flintwork of the chancel walls. St. Leonard's parish is now a member of The Langtree Team Ministry: a Church of England benefice that also includes the parishes of Checkendon, Ipsden, North Stoke, Stoke Row and Whitchurch-on-Thames. Woodcote also has Roman Catholic and Methodist churches.

The people of Woodcote and Exlade Street could not afford to pay a priest to serve at the chapel, and in 1597 it was recorded that the vicar of South Stoke held services at St. Leonard's only on Christmas Day, Easter Day and a few other days each year. Some worshippers travelled 3 miles (4.8 km) each way to South Stoke to go to church, but most preferred to travel less than 1 mile (1.6 km) to Saints' Peter and Paul in the adjacent parish of Checkendon. The law obliged everyone to worship in their own parishes, so since 1595 the Rector of Checkendon had prosecuted people from Exlade Street and Woodcote in the local archdeacon's court for coming to his church. In response the faithful of Exlade Street and Woodcote petitioned John Whitgift, Archbishop of Canterbury for permission to worship at Checkendon. Whitgift granted the request, so long as they continued to attend their parish church in South Stoke four times a year. In 1653 the faithful of Woodcote and Exlade Street petitioned for St. Leonard's to be made a separate parish, but their request was not granted.

== Schools ==
Langtree School, The Oratory School and Woodcote Primary School are all in the village. Langtree School is a comprehensive school and recently became a DfES Specialist Performing Arts College. Woodcote Breakfast Club and Woodcote After School Club are based in the primary school. There are two pre-schools. The Cabin pre-school was founded by Mrs Rose Hunt in 1974. It had two previous homes until in 1986, when Mrs Bella Saunders, the Chairperson at the time, along with the Management Committee began raising funds for a new building. £10,000 was raised in just twelve months. The current building was installed in 1987 during the Christmas holidays within the grounds of Langtree School. In September 1996, the name was changed from The Cabin Playschool to The Cabin Pre-School.

== Amenities ==
Woodcote has two shops – Londis and Co-op – and two pubs, The Red Lion and The Black Lion. The village post office closed in 2017. There is a children's playground built in October 2006 beside the main village green, which is next to the village hall. A basketball net is also available. Woodcote has a Women's Institute and a Goring and Woodcote Lions Club. Woodcote is surrounded in many parts by woodland. There are many country footpaths in the area.

== Sport ==
Woodcote FC Football Club currently has two teams. The First team plays in Premier Division of the North Berks League; the Development team plays in the North Berks League Division One. Home kit colours are black and white stripes. The away kit is red and white. Woodcote Cricket Club currently plays in the Berkshire Cricket League Premier Division.

== Woodcote Rally ==
Each year Woodcote hosts a steam, vintage and veteran transport and real ale festival, the proceeds of which are donated to local charities and organisations, and over the years has raised more than £450,000. The rally includes a funfair.

== Sources ==
- Emery, Frank (1974). The Oxfordshire Landscape. The Making of the English Landscape. London: Hodder & Stoughton. pp. 30, 96. ISBN 0-340-04301-6.
- Jordan, Vicky (1996). Woodcote - Portrait of a South Chiltern Village. Woodcote.
- Lobel, Mary D, ed. (1962). A History of the County of Oxford: Volume 7: Thame and Dorchester Hundreds. Victoria County History. pp. 93–112.
- Sherwood, Jennifer; Pevsner, Nikolaus (1974). Oxfordshire. The Buildings of England. Harmondsworth: Penguin Books. pp. 852–853. ISBN 0-14-071045-0.
