= Sonning Common =

Village in Oxfordshire, England

Coordinates: 51.512°N 0.977°W

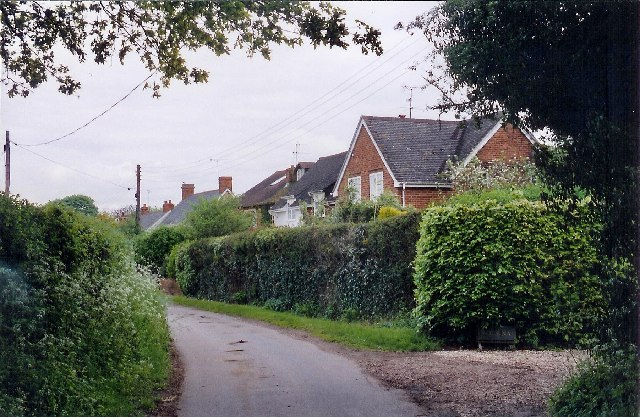
- Homes at Chalkhouse Green, Sonning Common.

- Location within Oxfordshire
- Area: 3.66 km^{2} (1.41 sq mi)
- Population: 3,784 (2011 census)
  - Density: 1,034/km^{2} (2,680/sq mi)
- OS grid reference: SU7180
- Civil parish: Sonning Common
- District: South Oxfordshire
- Shire county: Oxfordshire
- Region: South East
- Country: England
- Sovereign state: United Kingdom
- Post town: READING
- Postcode district: RG4
- Dialling code: 0118
- Police: Thames Valley
- Fire: Oxfordshire
- Ambulance: South Central
- UK Parliament: Henley and Thame
- Website: Sonning Common Parish

Sonning Common is a village and civil parish in a relatively flat, former common land part of the Chiltern Hills in South Oxfordshire, centred 3.5 miles (6 km) west south-west of Henley-on-Thames and 2.5 miles (4 km) north of Reading.

== History ==
During the English Civil War the village itself did not exist: being an area of open land east of the route between Reading – occupied alternately by the Parliamentarians and Royalists – and Oxford, which was the King's headquarters. In 1647 after the end of the first civil war, the King was imprisoned at nearby Caversham House (now the location of BBC Monitoring in Caversham); however he was allowed out under escort to play bowls at an inn (latterly called "The King Charles Head") near Cane End, approximately one mile west of Sonning Common. His route between these places would have brought him close to the present-day village.

The site of the village has been called "Sonning Common" since at least the 1640s, long before any fixed settlement existed. The name is literal, at the time gradually losing its earlier status of common grazing land belonging to Sonning Parish. Both places have intermittently been spelt 'Sunning' as seen on maps such as that of the A4 road from 1786, indicating contemporary pronunciation was as in the other three ancient parishes named after Sunna (Saxon chief) – the letter combination 'un' was avoided in Middle English as a result of Norman handwriting.

== Amenities ==
Serving as a meeting place to explore by footpaths the Chiltern Hills nearest to the large town of Reading, Sonning Common has a community of volunteers who guide regular Sonning Common Health Walks. Sonning Common has a Herb Farm (with a Saxon layout maze), Thames Valley Gymnastics Club and a health centre. Two neighbouring parishes, Kidmore End and Rotherfield Peppard, have their war memorial halls on the parish boundaries. The civil parish help maintain a pond with a duck-house in the middle called "Duckingham Palace", three children's playgrounds and a Millennium Green, public land, at the southern end of the village between Kennylands Road and Peppard Road. Wood Lane has a health centre, village hall, and most shops including: an Indian restaurant, a Chinese take-away, fish and chip shop, sandwich shop, post office, florist, supermarkets, petrol station, dental practice and general/charity stores. Public houses:

- The Bird in Hand
- The Butchers Arms
- The Hare and Hounds.

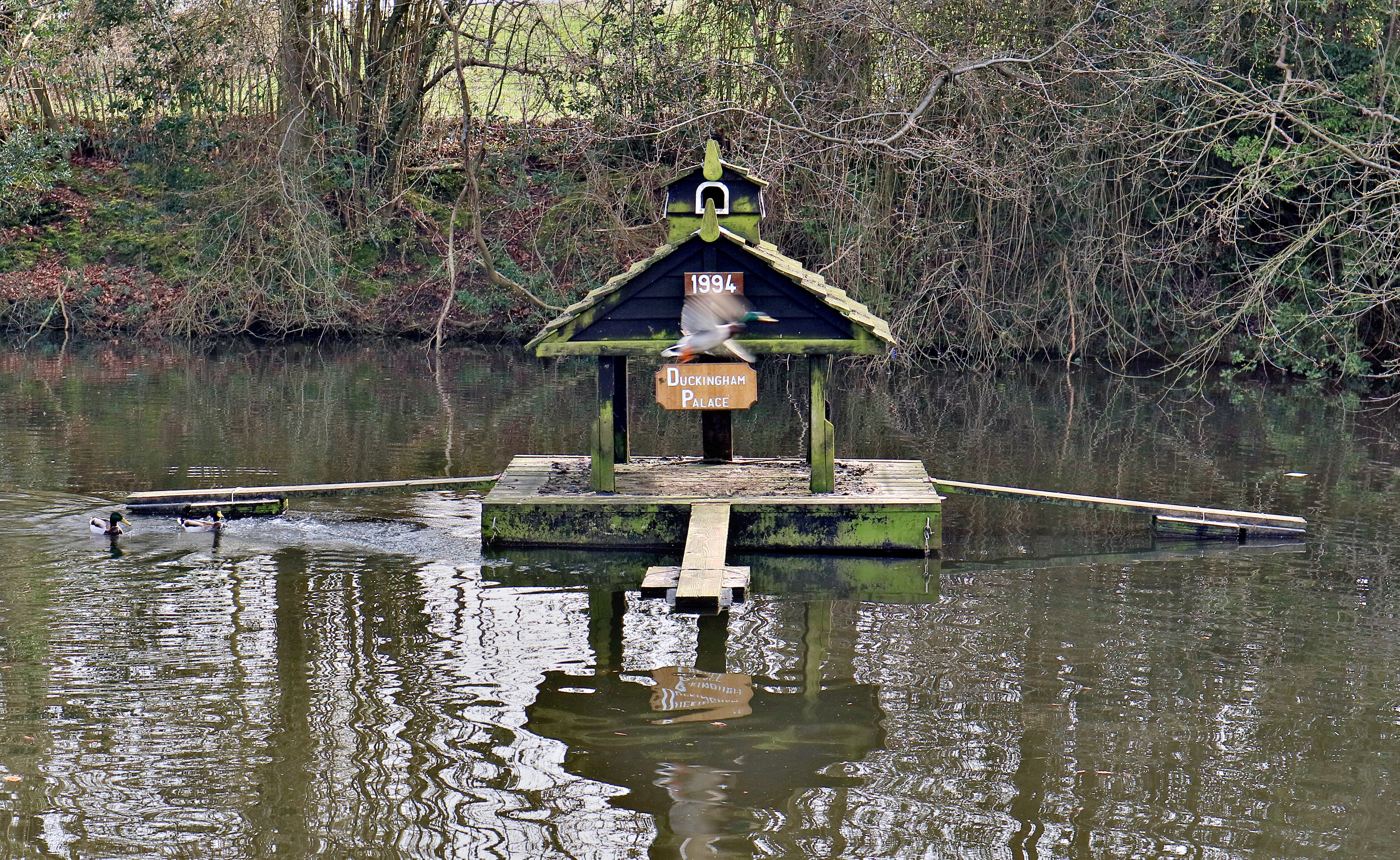
"Duckingham Palace" on Widmore Pond in Sonning Common

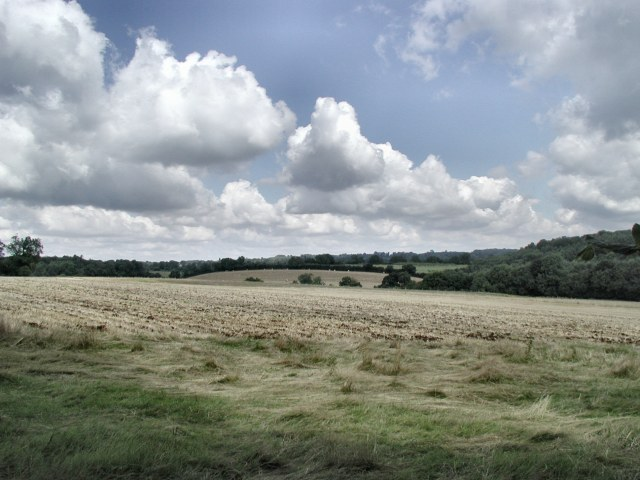
Hay meadow and woodland on borders with higher parts of the Chilterns.

== Churches ==
Churches are Christ the King (Church of England), Saint Michael's (Roman Catholic), and Sonning Common Free Church.

== Education ==
Sonning Common has a primary school, and Maiden Erlegh Chiltern Edge is the secondary school in the village. Sixth form students usually travel to The Henley College (Henley-on-Thames). There is also Bishopswood School which is a special school serving the wider area.

== Performing arts ==
The village has an amateur dramatic group, The Chiltern Players. (Note: Has existed since 1974.)

== Demography ==
2011 Census Key Statistics
| Output area | Population | Homes | % Owned outright | % Owned with a loan | % Socially rented | % Privately rented | km^{2} | km^{2} Greenspace (Note: Comprises cultivated fields, woodland, pasture and public parks/common.) | km^{2} gardens | km^{2} road and rail |
|---|---|---|---|---|---|---|---|---|---|---|
| Sonning Common (civil parish) | 3784 | 1547 | 45.4% | 34.5% | 12.8% | 5.7% | 3.66 | 2.46 | 0.74 | 0.17 |

The greenspace is mainly beech woodland with clearings and fields straddled by many paths. The Sonning Common Magazine is a not-for-profit community digital and delivered magazine to 1,850 addresses in the village every other month.

== Notes and references ==
Notes
