= Crowmarsh Gifford =

Village in Oxfordshire, England

Coordinates: 51.599°N 1.112°W

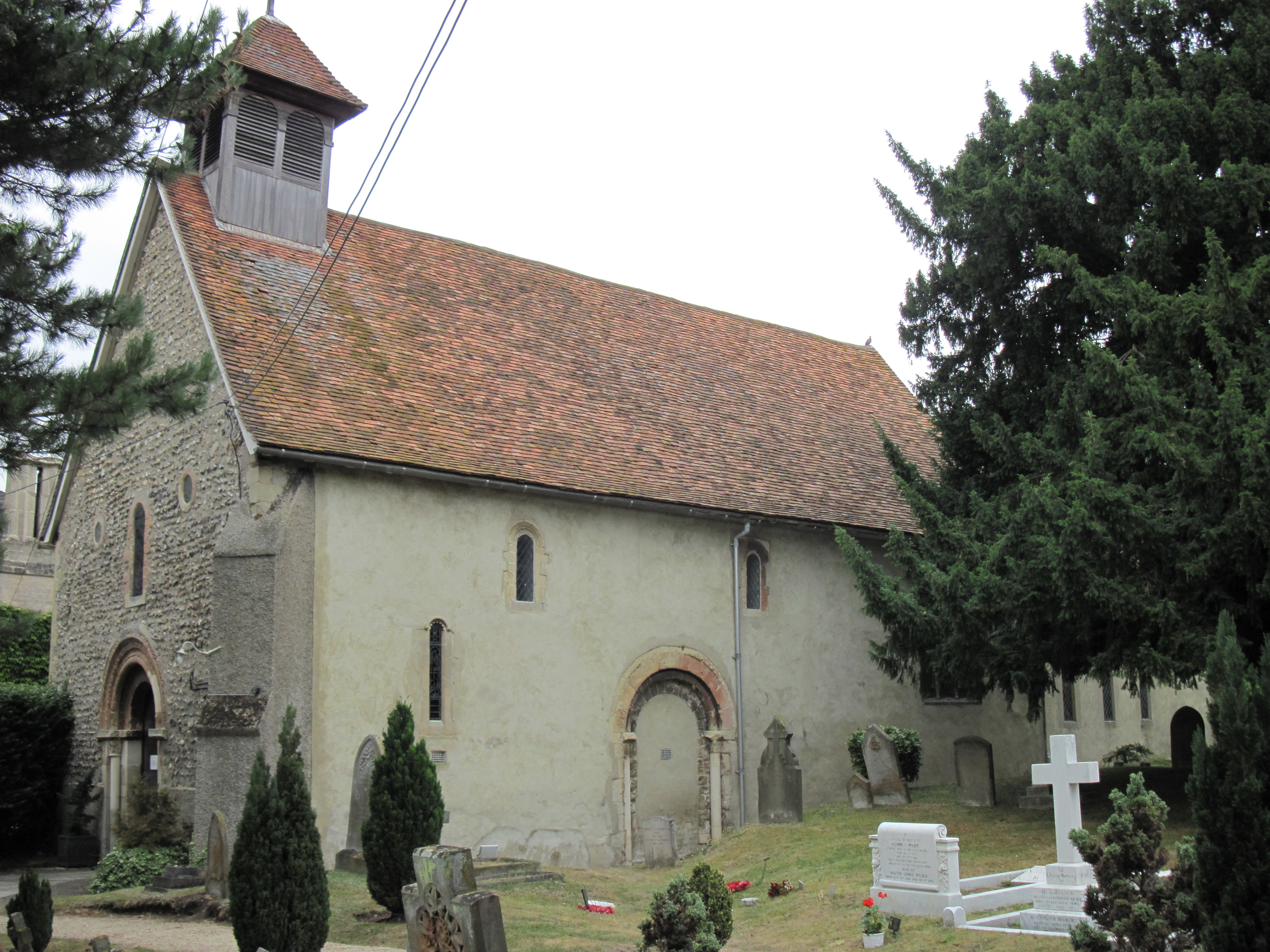
- St Mary Magdalene Church

- Location within Oxfordshire
- OS grid reference: SU6189
- Civil parish: Crowmarsh
- District: South Oxfordshire
- Shire county: Oxfordshire
- Region: South East
- Country: England
- Sovereign state: United Kingdom
- Post town: Wallingford
- Postcode district: OX10
- Dialling code: 01491
- Police: Thames Valley
- Fire: Oxfordshire
- Ambulance: South Central
- UK Parliament: Henley
- Website: Crowmarsh Gifford Community Site

Crowmarsh Gifford, commonly known as Crowmarsh, is a village in the civil parish of Crowmarsh, in the South Oxfordshire district, in the county of Oxfordshire, England. It is beside the River Thames opposite the market town of Wallingford, the two linked by Wallingford Bridge. Crowmarsh parish also includes the hamlet of Newnham Murren, which is now merged with the village; the hamlet of Mongewell, and the village of North Stoke 2 miles (3.2 km) to the south.

== History ==
After the Norman Conquest of England in 1066, most of the land was granted to Walter Giffard, later Earl of Buckingham. It later came into the possession of William Marshal, 1st Earl of Pembroke and remained with his heirs until passing back to the Crown. Nearby Newnham Manor was originally granted by William the Conqueror to Miles Crispin, but by 1428 was owned by Thomas Chaucer, son of the poet Geoffrey Chaucer. After his death it was passed to his daughter Alice, wife of William de la Pole, 4th Earl of Suffolk. Other land was granted to Battle Abbey.

The Church of England parish church of Saint Mary Magdalene is said to have been built in about 1120. The north door, south door, three windows in the south wall, chancel arch and font are all Norman. A north transept with a pointed arch was added in about 1200. The building was restored in 1836 and 1868. In 1139 King Stephen built a wooden fort in Crowmarsh, the first of a series built in opposition to Wallingford Castle, which supported his cousin Matilda during the civil war known as The Anarchy. The forts were probably dismantled as a result of the Treaty of Wallingford of 1153. The castle at Crowmarsh consisted of a 20-to-25 m (66-to-82 ft) wide ditch surrounding an enclosure measuring 50 by 35 m (164 by 115 ft).

In 1701 agriculturist Jethro Tull invented his revolutionary seed drill here. In 1770 nearby Mongewell Park was acquired by Shute Barrington, then Bishop of Llandaff. He was buried in Mongewell Church. Mongewell Park later became the site for Carmel College. The Jacobethan country house Howbery Court (also known as Howbery Park) in Crowmarsh was built in about 1850 for local MP William Seymour Blackstone. It now houses the facilities of HR Wallingford Group. Nearby North Stoke was the home of the contralto singer Dame Clara Butt, who died there and was buried locally in St Mary's Church graveyard in 1936.

In 1931 the civil parish had a population of 248. On 1 April 1932 the parish was abolished to form "Crowmarsh".

=== World War II ===
In 1944 a Royal Canadian Air Force Halifax bomber with a full bomb load caught fire over Wallingford. Most of the crew bailed out, but Flying Officer Johnny Wilding (USA) and Sergeant John Andrews (RAF) steered the plane away from the town, and attempted to land in the open fields of Crowmarsh, but crashed. They are commemorated by an obelisk at the junction of Wilding Road and Andrew Road in Wallingford.

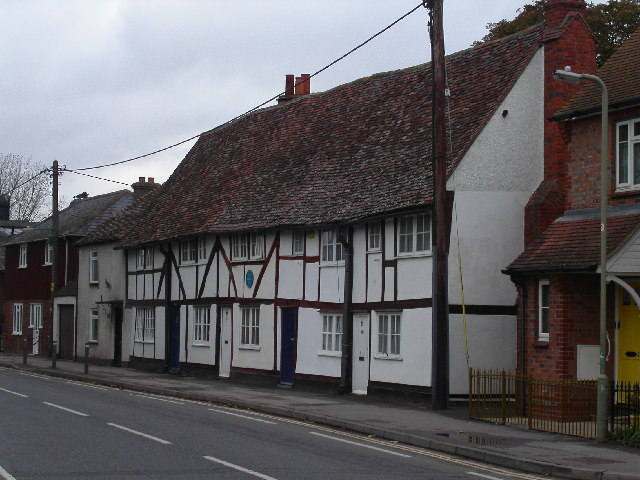
Cottages in Crowmarsh Gifford, home of Jethro Tull, 1700-1710

=== Recent times ===
Crowmarsh Gifford was the administrative headquarters of South Oxfordshire District Council. The Offices were badly damaged by fire on 15 January 2015.

== Sources ==
- Bradbury, J. (1996). Stephen and Matilda: the Civil War of 1139-1153. Stroud: Alan Sutton Publishing. ISBN 0-7509-0612-X.
- Laban, Greg (2013). "Evidence for a Stephanic Siege Castle at the Lister Wilder Site, The Street, Crowmarsh Gifford". Oxoniensia. 78. Oxfordshire Architectural and Historical Society: 189–212. ISBN 9789110003941.
- Pedgley, B.; Pedgley, D. (1990). Crowmarsh – A history of Crowmarsh Gifford, Newnham Murren, Mongewell and North Stoke. Crowmarsh History Group. ISBN 0-9516305-0-4.
- Sherwood, Jennifer; Pevsner, Nikolaus (1974). The Buildings of England: Oxfordshire. Harmondsworth: Penguin. pp. 561–562. ISBN 0-14-071045-0.
