= Michael Rosen (rabbi) =

Michael Rosen מיכאל רוזן
- Title: Rabbi

Personal life
- Born: 21 January 1945 Glasgow, Scotland
- Died: 8 December 2008 (aged 63) Jerusalem, Israel
- Buried: Har HaMenuchot cemetery
- Spouse: Gilla Ratzersdorfer Rosen
- Children: 6
- Parent(s): Rabbi Kopul and Bella Rosen
- Education: Grodno Yeshiva Beer Yaakov and University College London

Religious life
- Religion: Judaism
- Denomination: Orthodox
- Profession: Rabbi and teacher

Jewish leader
- Position: Founder
- Organisation: Yakar
- Began: 1978
- Ended: 2008
- Residence: Jerusalem, Israel
- Semikhah: 1973

Michael "Mickey" Rosen (Shmuel Meir ben HaRav Yaakov Kopul, 21 January 1945 – 8 December 2008) was a British-born Israeli rabbi and founder of Yakar, an innovative Jewish learning community and synagogue.

== Biography ==
Michael Rosen was one of three sons of Rabbi Yaakov Kopul and Bella Rosen. He was born in Glasgow, Scotland. His thinking was strongly influenced by his father, who rejected fundamentalism and obscurantism and instead embraced secular wisdom while remaining committed to religious life. Rosen was first educated at Carmel College, the school his father had founded based on this philosophical orientation. He then continued his education at the Slabodka Yeshiva and the Grodno Yeshiva Be'er Ya'akov, both in Bnei Brak. He received semikhah from the latter in 1973. In addition, he studied at the Harry Fischel Institute for Talmudic Research in Jerusalem, and was presented with a second semikhah by Chief Rabbi Isser Yehuda Unterman.

After serving as a rabbi near Manchester, Rosen opened a Jewish educational center in London in 1978 called Yakar – Center for Tradition and Creativity, whose name is an acronym of his father's name, Yaakov Kopul Rosen, and also means precious or worthy in the Hebrew language. In 1992 he established a Yakar center in Jerusalem and, in 2007, another in Tel Aviv. What was unique about the Yakar concept was that it blended traditional Jewish learning with social action, interfaith dialogue and the arts.

In 1994, Rosen received a Ph.D. from University College London after submitting a dissertation entitled A Commentary on Job Attributed to Rashbam. In 2008 he published a book about Hasidic Judaism entitled The Quest for Authenticity: The Thought of Reb Simchah Bunim about Simcha Bunim of Peshischa.

He spent his last three weeks in coma after a fall. He was buried on 9 December 2008 in the Har HaMenuchot cemetery in Jerusalem. He was survived by his wife, Gilla, six children, twenty six grandchildren, his two brothers, Rabbi Jeremy Rosen and Rabbi David Rosen, and his sister, Angela.

He was widely considered one of the most popular and revered Anglo-immigrant rabbis in Israel.
