= St John the Baptist's Church, Mongewell =

Coordinates: 51.586°N 1.123°W

- The windowless and nave-roofless building among mature deciduous trees plus a conifer and a yew from the southwest.

- Location in Oxfordshire
- OS grid reference: SU610877
- Location: Mongewell, Oxfordshire
- Country: England
- Denomination: Church of England
- Website: Churches Conservation Trust

History
- Dedication: Saint John the Baptist

Architecture
- Functional status: Redundant
- Heritage designation: Grade II
- Designated: 9 February 1959
- Architect(s): Lewis Wyatt, James Wyatt (possibly)
- Architectural type: Church
- Style: Norman, Gothic

Specifications
- Materials: Flint with stone dressings Brick tower. Tiled roof

St John the Baptist's Church is a closed, redundant Anglican church, partly in ruins, in Mongewell, Oxfordshire, England. It is recorded in the National Heritage List for England as a designated Grade II listed building, and is under the care of the Churches Conservation Trust. The ruins stand on the east bank of the River Thames, next to the former Carmel College, to the north of Mongewell Park, 2.5 miles (4 km) south of Wallingford, and near The Ridgeway long-distance path. Local Anglicans are in the parish of North Stoke: St Mary the Virgin.

== History ==
The church dates probably from the 12th century. It was remodelled in picturesque Gothick style for Rt. Rev. Shute Barrington late in the 18th century. Barrington was Bishop of Durham and the penultimate with highly exceptional great non-church powers namely by the position being one of Palatinate Prince-Bishop. When he died in 1826, he was buried in the family vault in the church. The church was restored under the direction of the architect Lewis Wyatt in 1880. It was designated a Grade II listed building on 9 February 1959. The church was declared redundant on 1 July 1981 and was vested in the Churches Conservation Trust on 31 July 1985. For access, the keyholder can be found nearby.

== Architecture ==
The church consists of a nave and a chancel with a west tower. It is built of flint with stone dressings. Brick buttresses support the nave walls. The tower is brick and the chancel roof is tiled. The nave has no roof. The lower part of the tower is round and the upper part is hexagonal with a battlemented parapet. The chancel is in Norman style, and contains two 18th-century monuments. One of these consists of a tomb with the effigy of a man dressed in "Eastern costume" including a turban.

== See also ==
- List of churches preserved by the Churches Conservation Trust in South East England
