= Eileen Boyd =

Australian singer (1890–1975)

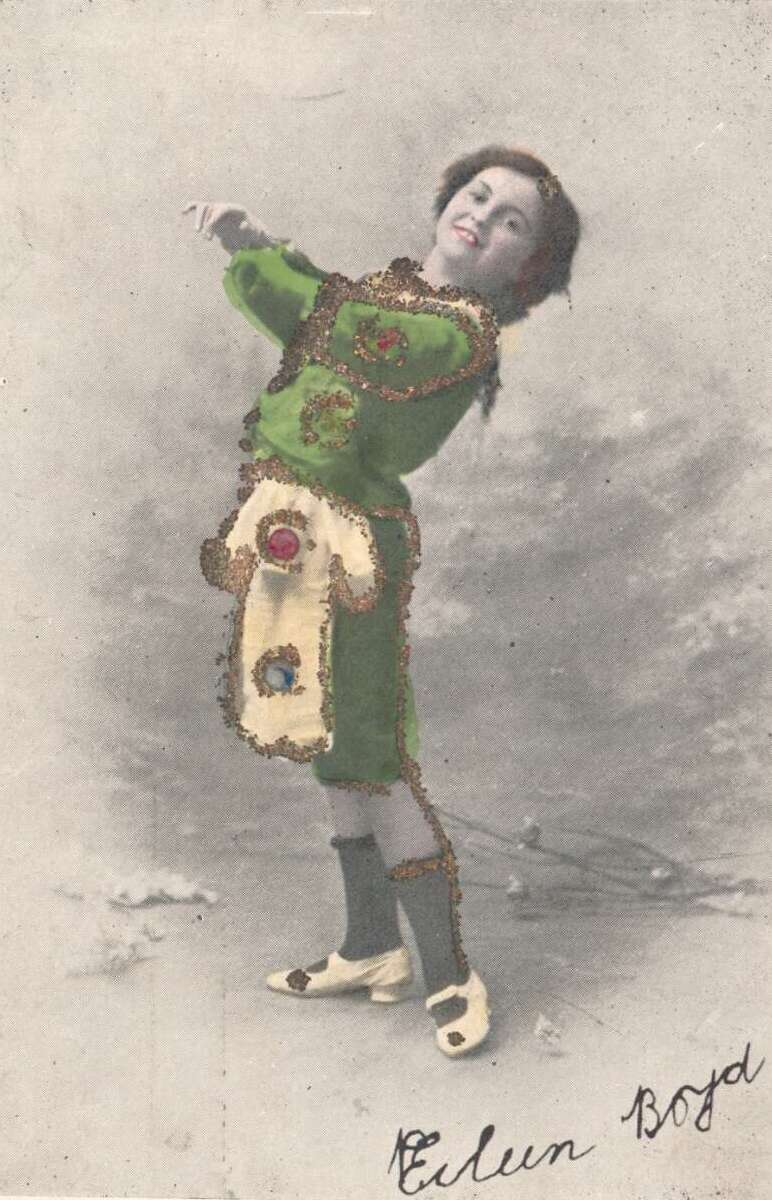
- Miss Eileen Boyd
- Born: Eileen Alberta Boyd; 13 December 1890; Sydney
- Died: 14 September 1975 (aged 84); Hammondville
- Other names: Mrs Gordon Lane
- Occupation: singer
- Known for: contralto
- Spouse(s): Hugh Ernest Roberts; Gordon Lane
- Children: two and step-daughter

Eileen Alberta Boyd became Mrs Gordon Lane (13 December 1890 – 14 September 1975) was an Australian singer. She began as a child performer and she toured in the UK during World War One.

== Life ==
Boyd was born in 1890 in Sydney to Margaret (born Shalvey) and Albert Boyd. Both her parents had been born in Australia and her father ran a hotel. Her parents arranged lessons for her in singing and elocution and she was a child singer. She toured New Zealand in 1900 when she was known as "The Baby Baritone, Clog Dancer and Whistler". She continued her education with a tutor while on tour. In 1910 a concert was arranged in Sydney to mark her transition from a child performer to a singer with a fine contralto voice. In 1915 she married in Britain in May and in October she was a widow with a child and a young teenage step-daughter. Her husband, Hugh Ernest Roberts had been a master mariner.

In 1917 she sang at the Royal Albert Hall in London and many prestigious venues when she joined a tour in support of the Red Cross starring and organised by Clara Butt and Kennerley Rumford. She and Butt were "favourably compared" and they sang The Dream of Gerontius being George V and Queen Mary in 1917. By 1925, she had two children although she still found time to sing as Mrs Gordan Lane.

In 1934 she was still using the name "Eileen Boyd" when recording. In 1937 it was "Mrs Gordon Lane" who commissioned a pastel portrait from the Australian artist Dora Wilson. It was called "Nada" and it was exhibited at Margaret MacLean's Gallery in Melbourne.

Boyd died in 1975 in Hammondville.

== Recordings include ==
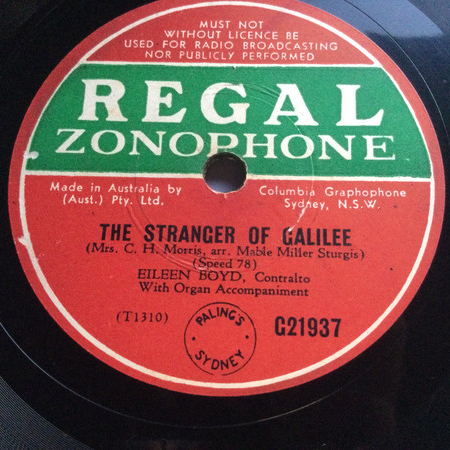
Stranger of Galilee

- Your King and Country Want You, Jumbo, c. 1915
- The Stranger of Galilee,1934
