= Stoke Row =

Village in Oxfordshire, England

Coordinates: 51.552°N 1.016°W

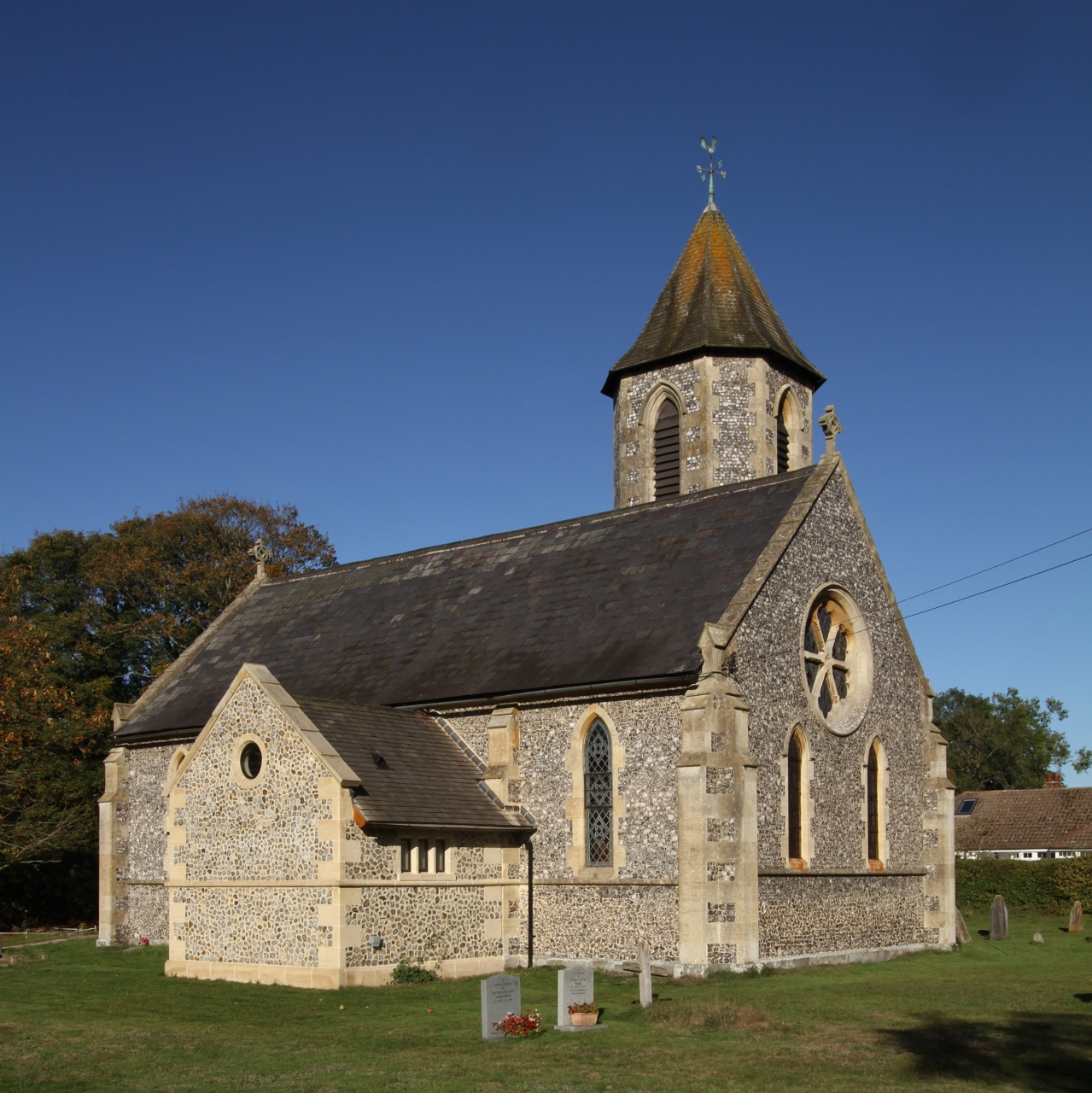
- St John the Evangelist parish church

- Location within Oxfordshire
- Area: 6.08 km^{2} (2.35 sq mi)
- Population: 651 (2011 Census)
  - Density: 107/km^{2} (280/sq mi)
- OS grid reference: SU6884
- Civil parish: Stoke Row
- District: South Oxfordshire
- Shire county: Oxfordshire
- Region: South East
- Country: England
- Sovereign state: United Kingdom
- Post town: Henley-on-Thames
- Postcode district: RG9
- Dialling code: 01491
- Police: Thames Valley
- Fire: Oxfordshire
- Ambulance: South Central
- UK Parliament: Henley and Thame
- Website: Stoke Row

Stoke Row is a village and civil parish in the Chiltern Hills, about 5 miles (8 km) west of Henley-on-Thames in South Oxfordshire and about 9 miles (14 km) north of Reading. The 2011 Census recorded the parish population as 651.

== History ==
The earliest known surviving record of the name is from 1435. Stoke is a common place-name derived from Old English, typically meaning a secondary settlement or outlying farmstead. With the affix "row" it means a "row of houses at Stoke". Stoke Row was a hamlet divided between the ancient parishes, and later civil parishes, of Ipsden, Newnham Murren and Mongewell. It was made a chapelry in 1849. From 1932 it was divided between Ipsden and Crowmarsh, into which Newnham Murren and Mongewell were merged. In 1952 Stoke Row was made a new civil parish.

== Parish church ==
The Church of England parish church of St John the Evangelist was consecrated in 1846. It was designed in 13th-century style by the architect R. C. Hussey and is built of knapped flint with stone dressings. The church has a north tower with an octagonal belfry and short spire with a wood shingle roof. The ecclesiastical parish is now a member of The Langtree Team Ministry: a Church of England benefice that also includes the parishes of Checkendon, Ipsden, North Stoke, Whitchurch-on-Thames and Woodcote.

The church is a Grade II listed building.

== Independent chapel ==
The history of Dissenters meeting in the village dates from 1691. Stoke Row Independent Chapel was built in 1815. It is a Georgian building with flint footings and a hipped roof of slate. In 1884 a Sunday school room was built at the back of the chapel. An extension was built in 1956. In 2015 an outdoor service was held to celebrate the chapel's bicentenary.

=== Ministers ===
- 1959–65: Pastor Ernest Dickerson
- 1967–72: Rev John Potts
- 1973–75: Rev Arthur Tilling
- 1977–90: Rev Padre Bernard Railton Bax
- 1990–2004: Rev John Harrington
- 2004–10: Rev David Holmwood
- 2010–16: Revs David and Sonia Jackson
- 2016– Rev Mark Taylor
- present: Rev Kevin Davies

== Maharajah's Well ==
Edward Anderton Reade, the local squire at Ipsden, had worked with the Maharajah of Benares in India in the mid-nineteenth century. Under Reade's leadership, a well was sunk in 1831 to aid the community in Azamgarh. Reade left the area in 1860, and after his departure, the Maharajah decided to make a contribution to Reade's home area in England. Recalling Reade's help in creating the Azimgurgh well in 1831 and his stories of water deprivation in his home area of Ipsden the Maharajah commissioned the well at Stoke Row and it was sunk in 1863. The Wallingford firm of RJ and H Wilder made the well mechanism in 1863 and completed the pavilion over the well in 1864. The pavilion is open-sided with a cupola on top and a golden-coloured elephant above the well mechanism. The well and pavilion can be seen in a small park on the north side of the main road through Stoke Row village.

Another Indian aristocrat, Maharaja Sir Deonarayun Singh, probably motivated the Stoke Row project, donated a well to the nearby village of Ipsden.

== Amenities ==
The village has two 17th-century pubs: the Cherry Tree Inn, a Brakspear tied house and the Crooked Billet a free house. Built in 1642 the pub is reputed to have once been the hideout of highwayman Dick Turpin, who was said to have been in love with the landlord's daughter, Bess. It was England's first gastropub and was the venue for Titanic star Kate Winslet's wedding reception. In June 1989 the British progressive rock band Marillion played its first performance with Steve Hogarth as frontman at the pub; a documentary DVD called From Stoke Row To Ipanema – A Year In The Life was subsequently produced. In the 1851 Census the head of the household at No 1 Stoke Row was George Hope, who built "The Hope" public house. This was later called "The Farmer" and today is Hope House, at the junction of Main Street with Nottwood Lane. The parish has a Church of England primary school.

== Notable residents ==
- George Cole (1925–2015), actor, lived in Stoke Row for more than 70 years.
- Carol Decker (born 1957), former singer of T'Pau, in 2006 became a joint tenant of the Cherry Tree Inn which her husband Richard Coates had established. It closed in 2012, but later reopened under new ownership.
- Nick Heyward (born 1961), singer-songwriter and guitarist, has lived in the village since 2014.

== Gallery ==
The Crooked Billet pub

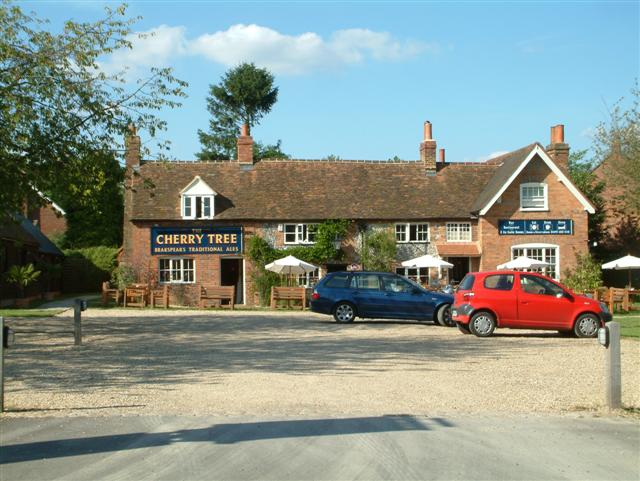
The Cherry Tree Inn

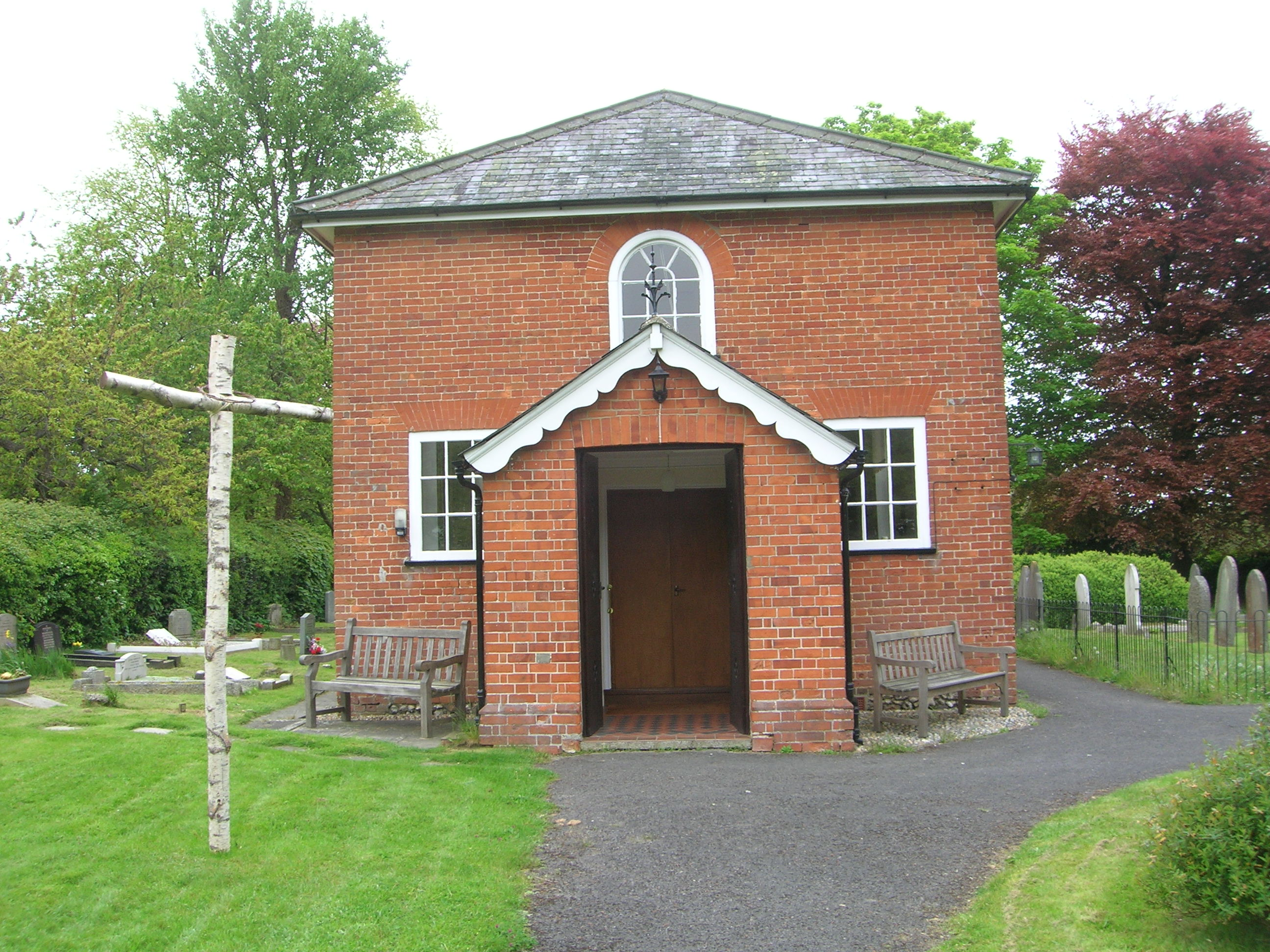
Stoke Row Independent Chapel

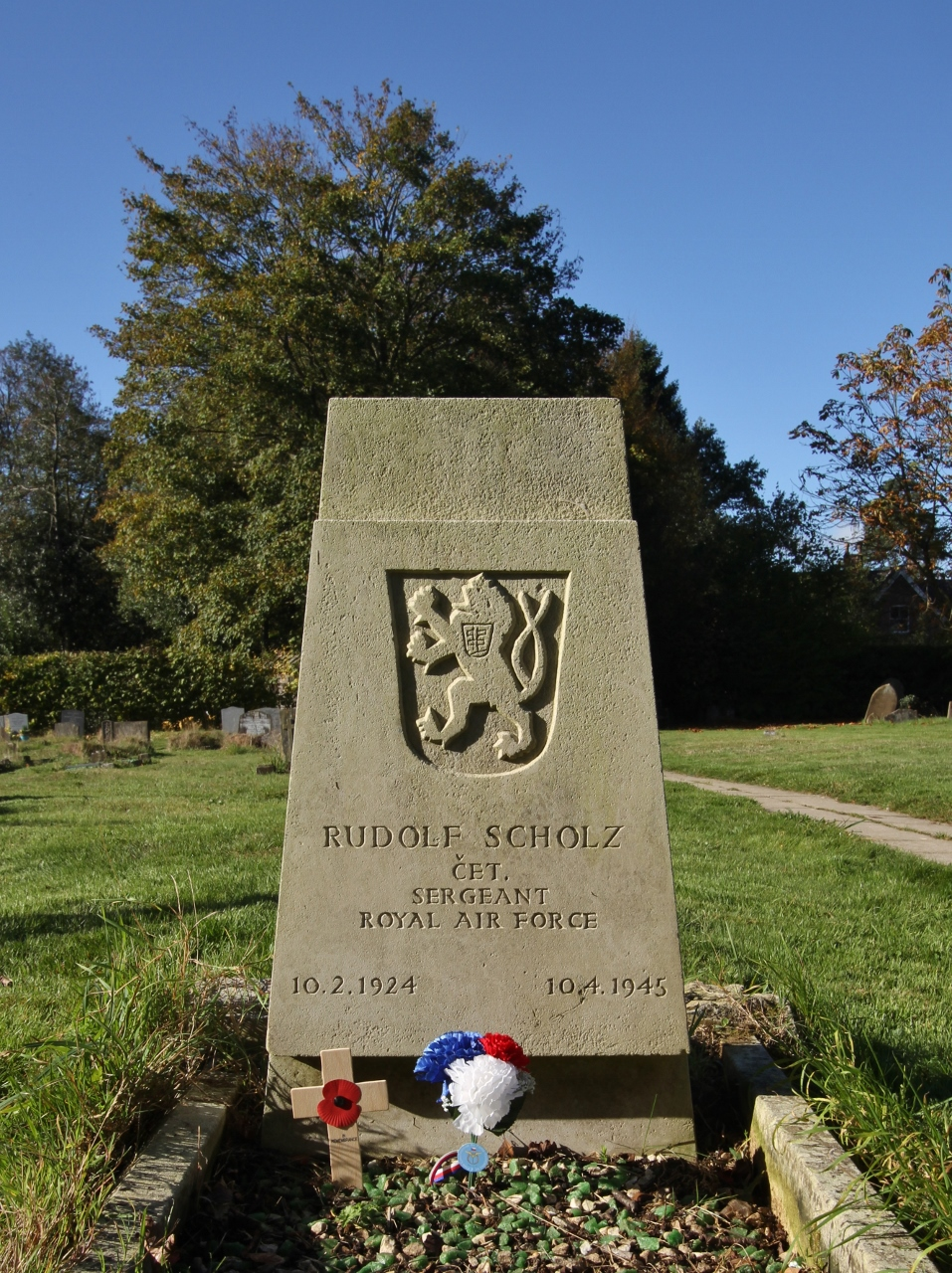
Grave of a Free Czechoslovak airman in St John's parish churchyard

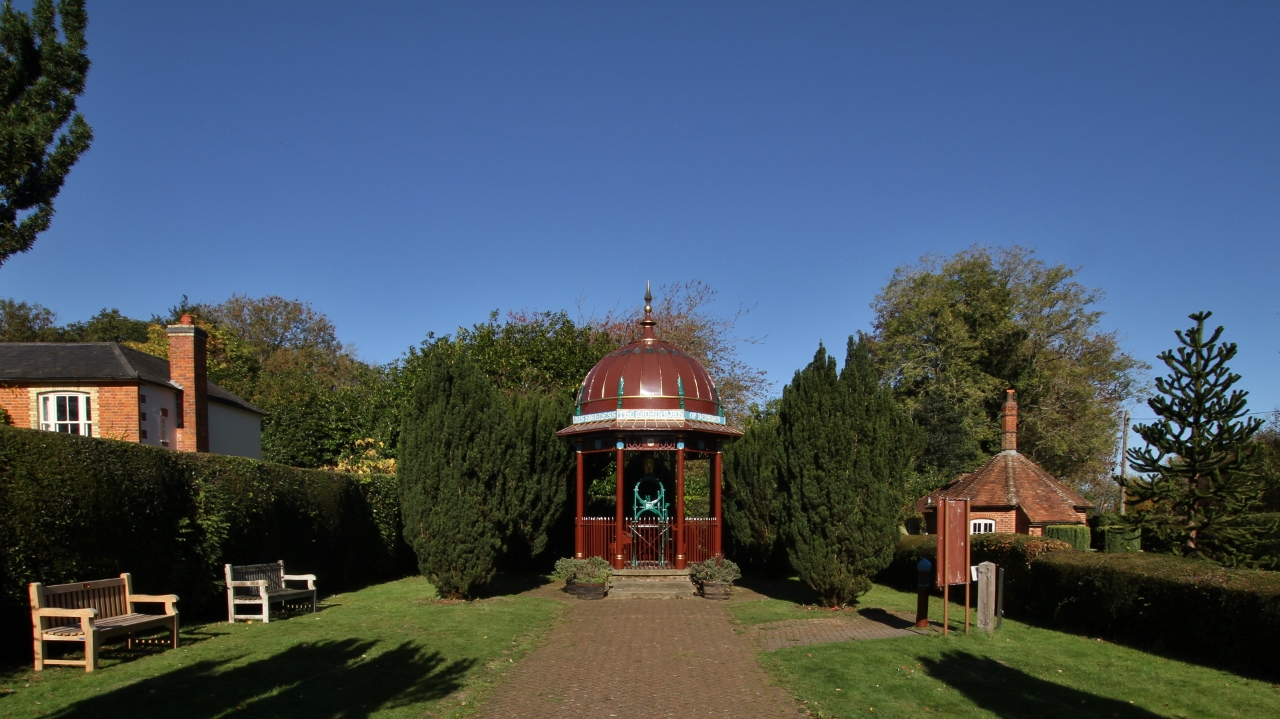
The Maharajah's Well, with Well Cottage behind the hedge on the right

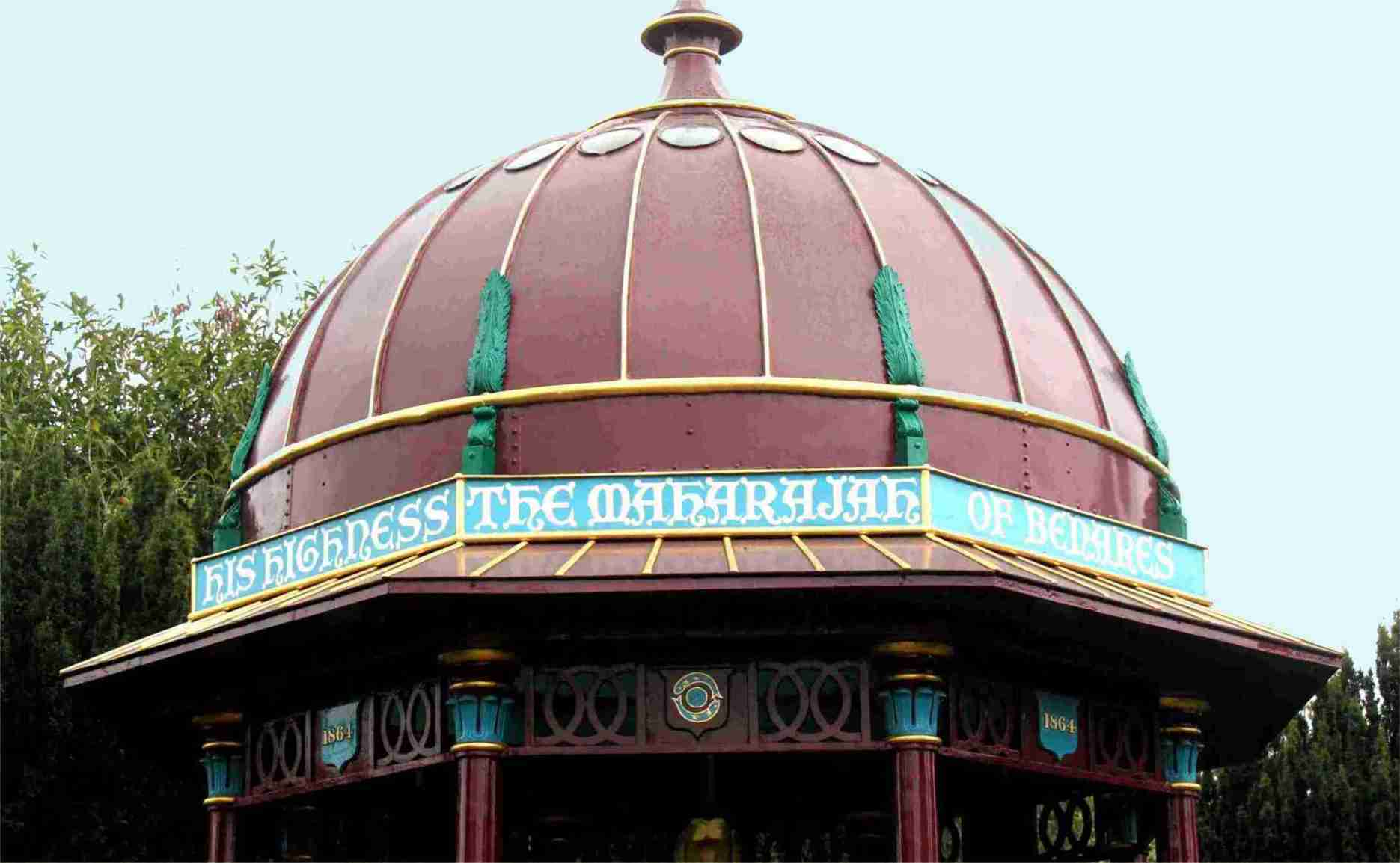
Maharajah's well cupola with wording "His Highness the Maharajah of Benares"

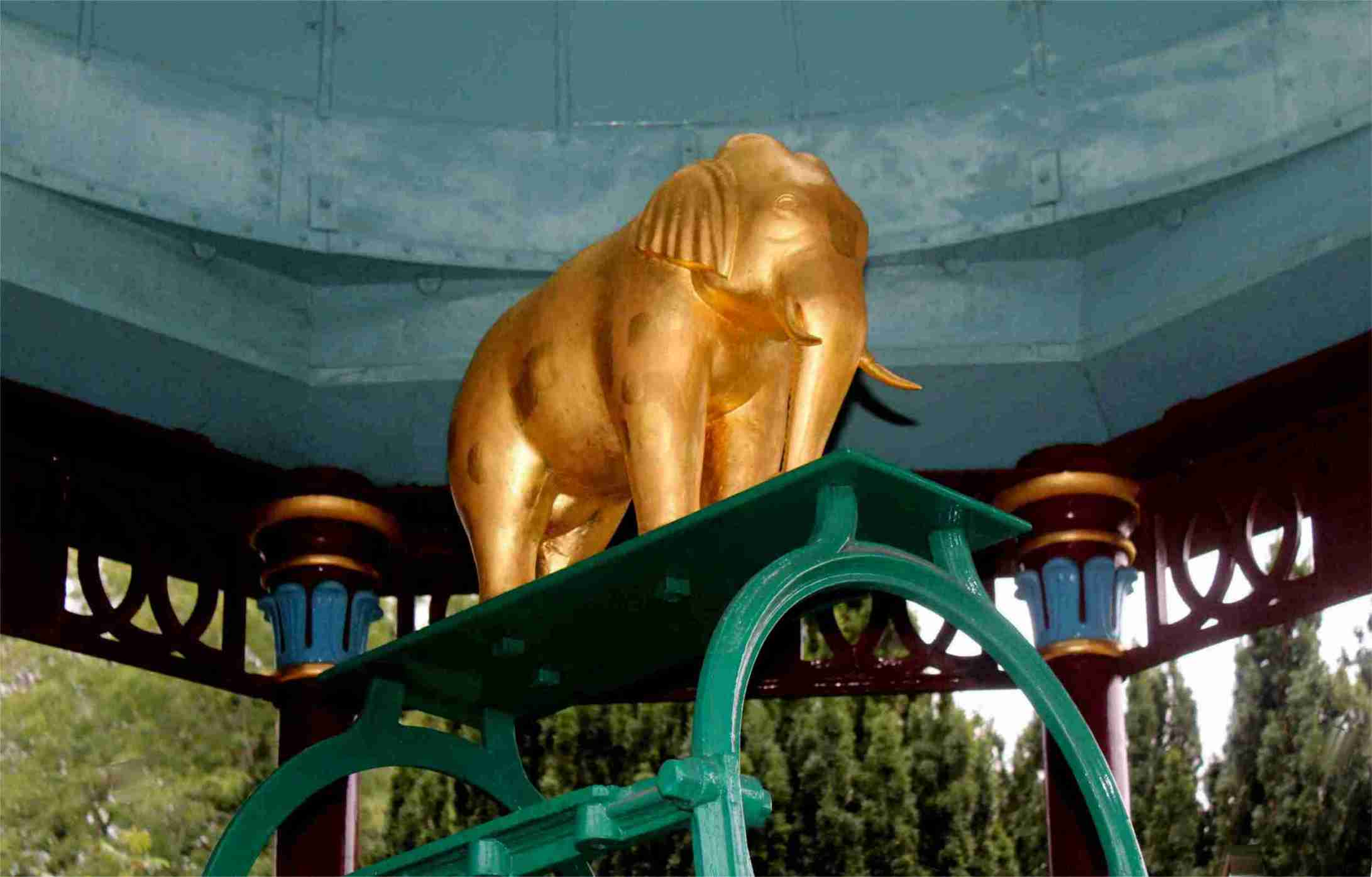
Maharajah's Well - golden elephant inside

== Sources ==
- Lewis, Samuel, ed. (1931) [1848]. A Topographical Dictionary of England (Seventh ed.). London: Samuel Lewis. pp. 220–224.
- Sherwood, Jennifer; Pevsner, Nikolaus (1974). Oxfordshire. The Buildings of England. Harmondsworth: Penguin Books. p. 789. ISBN 0-14-071045-0.
- Spencer-Harper, Angela (1999). Dipping into the Wells: The Story of the Two Chiltern Villages of Stoke Row and Highmoor Seen Through the Lives of Their Inhabitants. Witney: Robert Boyd Publications. ISBN 1-899536-35-3.
- Watts, Victor, ed. (2010). "Stoke Row". The Cambridge Dictionary of English Place-Names. Cambridge: Cambridge University Press. pp. 510, 577.
- Williamson, LD (1983). An Illustrated History of The Maharajah's Well. Stoke Row: The Maharajah's Well Trust.
- Wilson, John Marius (1870–72). Imperial Gazetteer of England and Wales. London and Edinburgh: A Fullarton and Co.
