= Kopul Rosen =

Anglo-Jewish rabbi and educationalist (1913–1962)

Yaacov Kopul Rosen

Rabbi of Higher Crumpsall Synagogue
- In office 1938–1942

Communal Rabbi of Glasgow
- In office 1942–1944

Principal Rabbi of the Federation of Synagogues
- In office 1944–1948

Personal life
- Born: 4 November 1913 Notting Hill, London, England
- Died: 16 March 1962 (aged 48)
- Notable work: Founder of Carmel College
- Education: Etz Chaim Yeshiva, Mir Yeshiva (Poland)
- Occupation: Rabbi, educationalist

Religious life
- Religion: Judaism
- Denomination: Orthodox

Yaacov Kopul Rosen (1913–1962) was an Anglo-Jewish rabbi and educationalist who, in 1946, testified before the Anglo-American Commission of Inquiry on Palestine, asking them not to "play politics with the remnants of the Jewish people." A book titled Memories of Kopul Rosen was published in 1970.

== Biography ==
Yaacov Kopul Rosen was born on 4 November 1913, in Notting Hill, London. He trained for the rabbinate in the Etz Chaim Yeshiva in London and in the Mir Yeshiva in Lithuania. He was the rabbi of the Higher Crumpsall Synagogue in Manchester from 1938 until 1942. He became the Communal Rabbi of Glasgow in 1942 and in 1944 he was appointed the Principal Rabbi of the Federation of Synagogues in London.

Rosen died of leukemia in March 1962 at the age of 48, leaving behind his wife, Bella, three sons, Jeremy (b . 1942), Michael (1945–2008) and David (b. 1951), and a baby daughter, Angela (Ayelet) (b. 1959). All three sons became rabbis.

A book about his father was published by Jeremy in 2010 (revised 2012).

== Carmel College ==
In 1948 Rosen decided to leave the rabbinate to devote himself to the promotion of Jewish education. He and his wife, Bella, founded Carmel College an independent Jewish boarding school in Oxfordshire, UK. The school, which practiced Orthodox Judaism, was described in a 1973-published book, Carmel College in the Kopel Era: A History of Carmel College, September 1948-March.

== YAKAR ==
In 1979 Rosen's second son, Michael (Mickey) Rosen, founded the Jewish educational organization, Yakar, in memory of his father. (YaKaR is both an acronym for Yaacov Kopul Rosen and means in Hebrew precious.) The stated goal of Yakar is to continue Kopul Rosen's ideals "of a Judaism based on knowledge of Torah, learning and vibrant spirituality that would at the same time be universal, non-denominational, tolerant and open to ideas and intellectual curiosity."

== Works by Kopul Rosen ==
- Dear David
- Rabbi Israel Salanter and the Musar movement
- The future of the Federation of Synagogues
- An open letter to a perplexed parent

== Personal ==
His wife's name was Bella. They had three sons, rabbis, and a daughter, who attended Carmel College.
