= Jeremy Rosen =

British rabbi

Rabbi Jeremy Rosen
- ג'רמי רוזן

Director, Yakar Educational Foundation, London
- In office 1999–2006

Chairman, Faculty for Comparative Religion, Antwerp

Personal life
- Born: 11 September 1942
- Spouse: Vera Zippel (m. 1971; div. 1986), Susana Kaszirer (m. 1988)
- Children: Anushka, Jacky, Natalia, Avichai
- Education: Cambridge University
- Occupation: Orthodox rabbi, author, lecturer
- Website: Jeremy Rosen Online

Religious life
- Religion: Judaism
- Denomination: Orthodox

Jeremy Rosen (Hebrew: ג'רמי רוזן; born 11 September 1942) is an Orthodox rabbi, author, and lecturer. Rosen is an advocate of modern Orthodox Judaism which aims to balance tolerance of modernity, individual variations and a commitment to Jewish law (Halacha). His articles and weekly column appear in publications in several countries, including the Jewish Telegraph and the Jewish News, and often comments on religious issues on the BBC. He is director of Yakar Educational Foundation in London, and chairman of the Faculty for Comparative Religion (FVG) in Antwerp.

== Biography ==
Rosen was born in Manchester, England, the eldest son of Rabbi Kopul Rosen and Bella Rosen. His brothers, Michael Rosen (1945–2008) and David Rosen (b. 1951) also entered the rabbinate.

Jeremy Rosen's thinking was strongly influenced by his father, who rejected fundamentalist and obscurantist approaches in favour of being open to the best the secular world has to offer while remaining committed to religious life. Rosen was first educated at Carmel College, the school his father had founded based on this philosophical orientation. At his father's direction, he also studied at Be'er Yaakov Yeshiva (1957–1958 and 1960) and at Merkaz Harav Kook in Israel (1961). Upon returning to Britain, he was admitted to read moral sciences (philosophy) at Pembroke College, Cambridge, graduating with a second-class degree in 1965.

Following graduation, Rosen attended Mir Yeshiva in Jerusalem (1965–68), where he received semicha from Rabbi Chaim Leib Shmuelevitz in addition to Rabbi Dovid Povarsky of Ponevezh and Rabbi Moshe Shmuel Shapiro of Yeshivat Be'er Ya'akov. In 1966, while still at Mir, Rosen spent three months as rabbi of the Bulawayo Hebrew Congregation in Zimbabwe (then called Southern Rhodesia). A member of the congregation at that time recalls:

"After Rabbi Yesorsky passed away there came to Bulawayo a rabbi unlike any we had ever known—Jeremy Rosen. ALL the girls fell in love with him. He was a really special person and left a lasting impression on the whole community. He made the religion become very much a living entity and not something that belonged to the rabbi and the synagogue goers."

Rosen began his full-time rabbinic career in 1968 at the Giffnock and Newlands Hebrew Congregation in the Greater Glasgow area. A portrait of him painted by David Donaldson during that time is part of the Royal Scottish Academy collection.

In 1971, Rosen was asked to become headmaster of Carmel College, upon the sudden resignation of the headmaster who had succeeded his father after his death in 1962. Carmel College, which was founded as a boys' boarding school, had become coeducational in 1969. Rabbi Rosen felt the school had become a rather secular imitation of English public schools, and worked to turn it back into a more proactively religious Jewish school. He believed in keeping the school small and selective, and sought to maintain the goals of high academic and cultural standards, while also upgrading the quality of the Jewish education.

Constant financial pressure, as well as difficulties in finding competent Jewish staff, eventually led Rabbi Rosen to resign in 1984. He took a sabbatical in Israel, where he lectured at the WUJS Institute in Arad and at Ben Gurion University of the Negev with Rabbi Pinchas Hacohen Peli. While at Ben Gurion he began work on his PhD on Wittgenstein and Religion, which he completed in 1994.

After this sabbatical, Rosen returned to the rabbinate, choosing a small but independent Orthodox synagogue in central London called The Western Synagogue. Most of its members had moved away from the area, but it had its own burial grounds and was financially secure. Rosen felt that the independence of the Western Synagogue provided him the opportunity to reach different communities and constituencies, and a platform from which to offer an alternative and more open Orthodox viewpoint than what he saw as the increasingly narrow and controlled atmosphere of the mainstream Orthodox rabbinate. He became Chief Rabbi Jakobovits's cabinet member for Interfaith Affairs, which he regarded as his one concession to the mainstream United Synagogue.

When, in 1990, the Western Synagogue merged with Marble Arch Synagogue under the auspices of the United Synagogue, Rosen declined to come under the authority of the mainstream religious authorities. After helping as a temporary rabbi during the transition, he moved to Antwerp, Belgium, where he became chairman of the Faculty for Comparative Religion (F.V.G.). For the next seven years, he taught at Brussels under the aegis of C.E.J.I., while also working in his wife's family business. In 1997, Rosen moved to New York, where he worked as an educational and rabbinic consultant, teaching and advising schools and communities on developing new programs and improving their performance.

He returned to London in 1999 to head the British branch of the Yakar Educational Foundation, which had been founded by his younger brother, Michael (Mickey) Rosen, to further the teachings of their late father. (The name "Yakar", the Hebrew for "precious", is formed from the acronym of his name, Yaacov Kopul Rosen.) At that time, Jeremy became rabbi of the Yakar Kehilla, the synagogue associated with the foundation. The same year, Mickey founded the Yakar synagogue in Jerusalem.

In 2003, Jeremy and Mickey Rosen sold the buildings and assets of the Yakar UK location, applying the funds toward the establishment of a Yakar location in Tel Aviv that would be run by former Yakar UK Rabbi Yehoshua Engelman, in addition to its primary location in Jerusalem. After that time, the Yakar Kehilla began holding services at the Independent Jewish Day School in Hendon. In 2006, Rosen resigned from Yakar Kehilla, to focus more time on new writing endeavours.

In 2007 Rosen retired to New York City, but in 2009 accepted the position of rabbi to the Persian Jewish Center of Manhattan. He also teaches classes at the Jewish Community Center of Manhattan. Rosen continues to write and lecture.

He was married to Vera Zippel, from Milan, Italy, in 1971. They had four children, Anushka, Jacky, Natalia, and Avichai. The marriage was dissolved in 1986, and in 1988 he married Susana Kaszirer from Antwerp, Belgium.

== Bibliography ==
- Exploding Myths that Jews Believe (1999) ISBN 978-0-7657-6135-4
- Understanding Judaism (2003) ISBN 978-1-903765-28-9
- Kabbalah Inspirations (2005) ISBN 978-1-84483-160-9
- Beyond the Pulpit (2005) ISBN 978-1-84547-093-7
- Can We Talk About God (2015) ISBN 978-1512307962
- Can We Talk About Religion (2015) ISBN 978-1515344223
- Commitment and Controversy: Living in Two Worlds Vol 1. (2015) ISBN 978-1512334432
- Commitment and Controversy: Living in Two Worlds Vol 2. (2016) ISBN 978-1537569383
- Varieties of Religious Thought: Orthodoxy in the Modern World (2016) ISBN 978-0692710050

== General references ==
- Who's Who 2007: an Annual Biographical Dictionary (159th ed.). A & C Black. ISBN 978-0-7136-7527-6
- Seven Years at Carmel College
