= St Mary's Church, Newnham Murren =

Coordinates: 51.5919°N 1.1203°W

- St Mary's Church, Newnham Murren, from the northeast

- Location in Oxfordshire
- OS grid reference: SU 610 885
- Location: Newnham Murren, Oxfordshire
- Country: England
- Denomination: Anglican
- Website: Churches Conservation Trust

Architecture
- Functional status: Redundant
- Heritage designation: Grade II*
- Designated: 9 February 1959
- Architectural type: Church
- Style: Norman, Gothic, Gothic Revival

Specifications
- Materials: Flint with stone dressings Tiled roofs

St Mary's Church is a redundant Anglican church in the hamlet of Newnham Murren, Oxfordshire, England. It is recorded in the National Heritage List for England as a designated Grade II* listed building, and is under the care of the Churches Conservation Trust. The church stands at the end of a farm track, overlooking the River Thames, near The Ridgeway long-distance path.

== History ==
The church dates from the 12th century, with additions and alterations in the following century. It was restored in 1849. During the 19th century the porch and bellcote were added. The church was declared redundant on 23 January 1973, and was vested in the Churches Conservation Trust on 21 May 1974. For access, the keyholder can be found nearby.

== Architecture ==
St Mary's is constructed in flint with stone dressings, and has a tiled roof. Its plan consists of a nave with a south aisle, a chancel and a north porch. At the west end of the nave gable is a bellcote. The porch is timber-framed on a flint base, with a tiled roof. The doorway is Norman in style. To the left of the porch is a lancet window, there are two lancets in the north wall of the chancel, and similar windows in the south wall. The east window dates from the 19th century; it has three lights, and contains plate tracery.

The interior wall of the church is limewashed, and the windows contain stained glass. The roof dates from the medieval period. The chancel arch is in Norman style, and to its right is a squint. In the chancel is a piscina in a recess in its south wall, and in the north wall is a double aumbry. The 1849 restoration removed most of the fittings, but a Jacobean pulpit and communion table are still present. On the wall of the aisle is a monumental brass dating from the 16th century.

== See also ==
- List of churches preserved by the Churches Conservation Trust in South East England
