= Crowmarsh =

Civil parish in Oxfordshire, England

Coordinates: 51.58°N 1.10°W

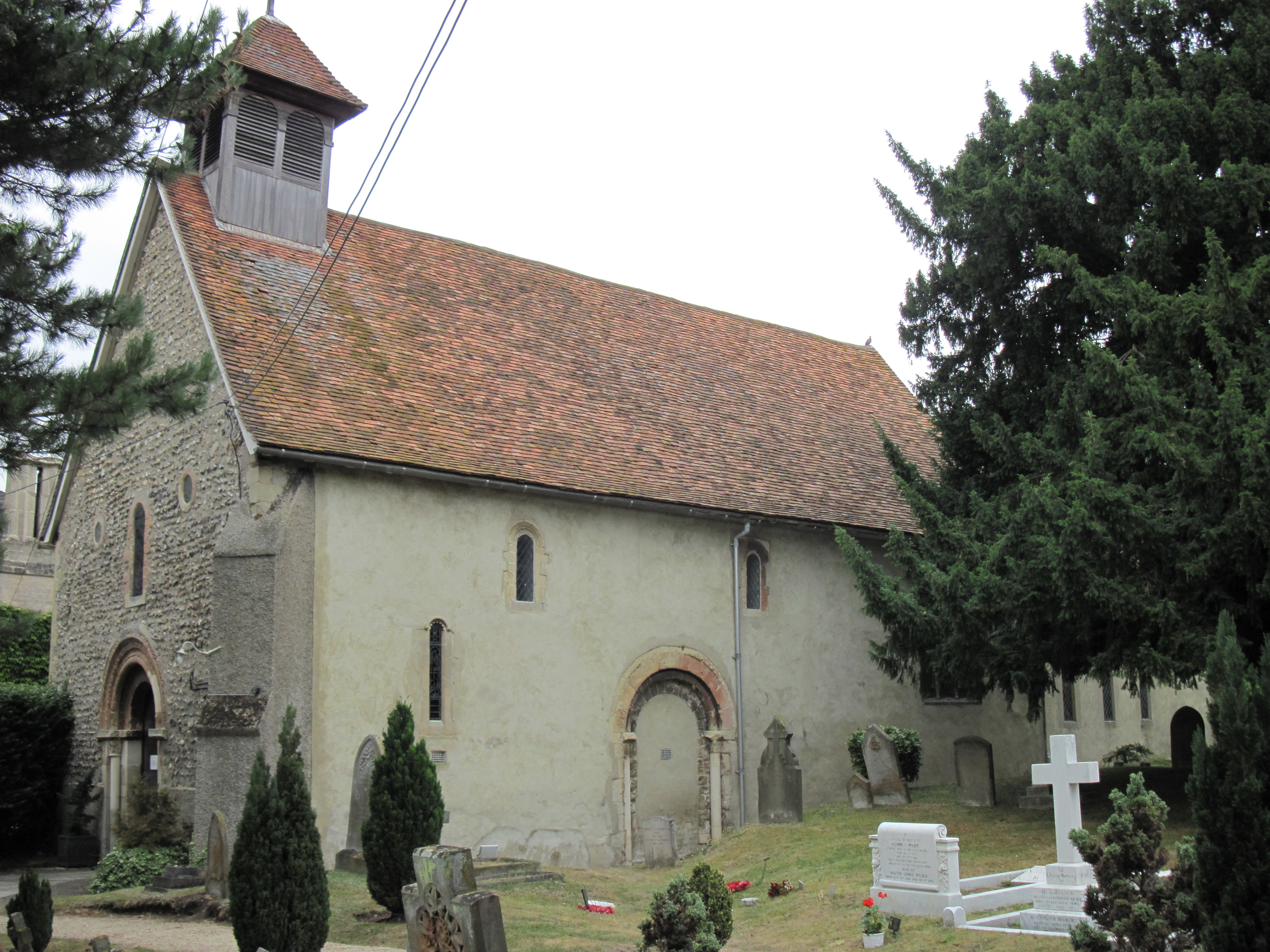
- Crowmarsh Gifford

- Location within Oxfordshire
- Area: 12.02 km^{2} (4.64 sq mi)
- Population: 2,830 (2011 Census)
  - Density: 235/km^{2} (610/sq mi)
- Civil parish: Crowmarsh
- District: South Oxfordshire
- Shire county: Oxfordshire
- Region: South East
- Country: England
- Sovereign state: United Kingdom
- Post town: Wallingford
- Postcode district: OX 10
- Dialling code: 01491
- Police: Thames Valley
- Fire: Oxfordshire
- Ambulance: South Central
- UK Parliament: Henley and Thame

Crowmarsh is a fairly large, mostly rural civil parish in the South Oxfordshire, district, in the county of Oxfordshire, England, east and southeast of the town of Wallingford on the opposite bank of the River Thames and may also refer to its larger district council ward which extends to Ipsden and Nuffield. In 2011 it had a population of 2830.

== Formation and constituent settlements ==
The civil parish was formed on 1 April 1932 by the amalgamation of four existing parishes. The four parishes retain their individual identities. Crowmarsh Gifford and Newnham Murren are contiguous villages divided by The Street, the road which leads to Wallingford Bridge. In the south of the parish are the hamlet-size villages of North Stoke and Mongewell.

== Governance ==
As a civil parish, Crowmarsh has three tiers of local government. The lowest tier is Crowmarsh Parish Council, which has responsibility for minor matters such as allotments, open spaces and community halls. The parish council has 12 members, elected for a four-year term. The middle level is South Oxfordshire District Council (with responsibility for matters such as housing, planning and waste collection). The district is divided into 19 wards for the elections of councillors. Crowmarsh ward also comprises the parishes of Ipsden and Nuffield and elects one councillor to the 48 member authority. The upper tier of local government is Oxfordshire County Council, which administers "wide area" strategic services such as education, highways and social services. Crowmarsh forms part of the Benson electoral division, returning one councilor to the 74 member body.

== Sources ==
- Pedgley, B; Pedgley, D (1990). Crowmarsh – A history of Crowmarsh Gifford, Newnham Murren, Mongewell and North Stoke. Crowmarsh History Group. ISBN 0-9516305-0-4.
