= Kennerley Rumford =

English singer (1870–1957)

- Kennerley Rumford, c. 1905.

Background information
- Born: Robert Henry Kennerley Rumford; 2 September 1870; Hampstead, London, England
- Died: 9 March 1957 (aged 86) North Stoke, Oxfordshire, England
- Occupation: Singer
- Years active: 1896–1957
- Spouses: Clara Butt (m. 1900; died 1936) Dorothy Jane Elwin (m. 1941)
- Children: 3

Robert Henry Kennerley Rumford (2 September 1870 – 9 March 1957) was an English baritone singer of the 20th century. He was first known for his performances of oratorios, but following his marriage to the well-known contralto singer Clara Butt, he toured with her throughout the English-speaking world singing repertoire of a more popular type. He was twice mentioned in dispatches while serving on the Western Front during the First World War.

== Early and personal life ==
Kennerley Rumford was born in Hampstead, London, England in 1870 the son of Joseph Kennerley Rumford who was related to Count Rumford the celebrated scientist. He was educated at King's School Canterbury and also in Frankfurt and Paris. He studied singing in Paris under Giovanni Sbriglia (in 1894) and Jacques Bouhy, and in London under George Henschel. He also studied under Blume, Lierhammer and Jean de Reszke. On 26 June 1900 he married the contralto singer Clara Butt – they had one daughter and two sons before Clara died in 1936. In 1941 he married Dorothy Jane Elwin.

== Career ==
Rumford made his first appearance in 1896 at St James's Hall in London. He went on to sing at the Birmingham and Handel festivals and at nearly all the principal London and provincial concerts and festivals. He made his reputation with works of a serious kind such as Bach's St. Matthew Passion (Bach Festival at Queen's Hall 6 April 1897) and Brahms's Ernste Gesänge (St. James's Hall Popular Concert 31 January 1898). He appeared before both Queen Victoria and King Edward VII.

After his marriage to Clara Butt he performed with her in concerts of a more popular kind – they performed "Grand Concerts" at the Royal Albert Hall in London and in tours all over the English-speaking world. During the First World War (1914–1917) Rumford served in France where he was twice mentioned in dispatches; later (from 1917) he worked in the Special Intelligence Department of the War Office.

== Recordings ==
Rumford's earliest recording dates from 1899, when he recorded "Night Hymn at Sea" (Goring Thomas) with Clara Butt on a 7-inch Berliner disc. Between 1909 and the mid-1920s he made a number of recordings for His Master's Voice and (from 1915) the Columbia Graphophone Company, some solo but many with Clara, for example "The Yeomen of England" from Merrie England (Edward German) in 1909 (solo), "Abide with Me" (Liddle) in 1909 (with Clara) and "O That We Two were Maying" in 1925 (with Clara).

== Death ==
He died in North Stoke, Oxfordshire, England on 9 March 1957 aged 86. He is buried in St Mary churchyard, North Stoke, Oxfordshire.
