= Your King and Country Want You =

British WWI patriotic song

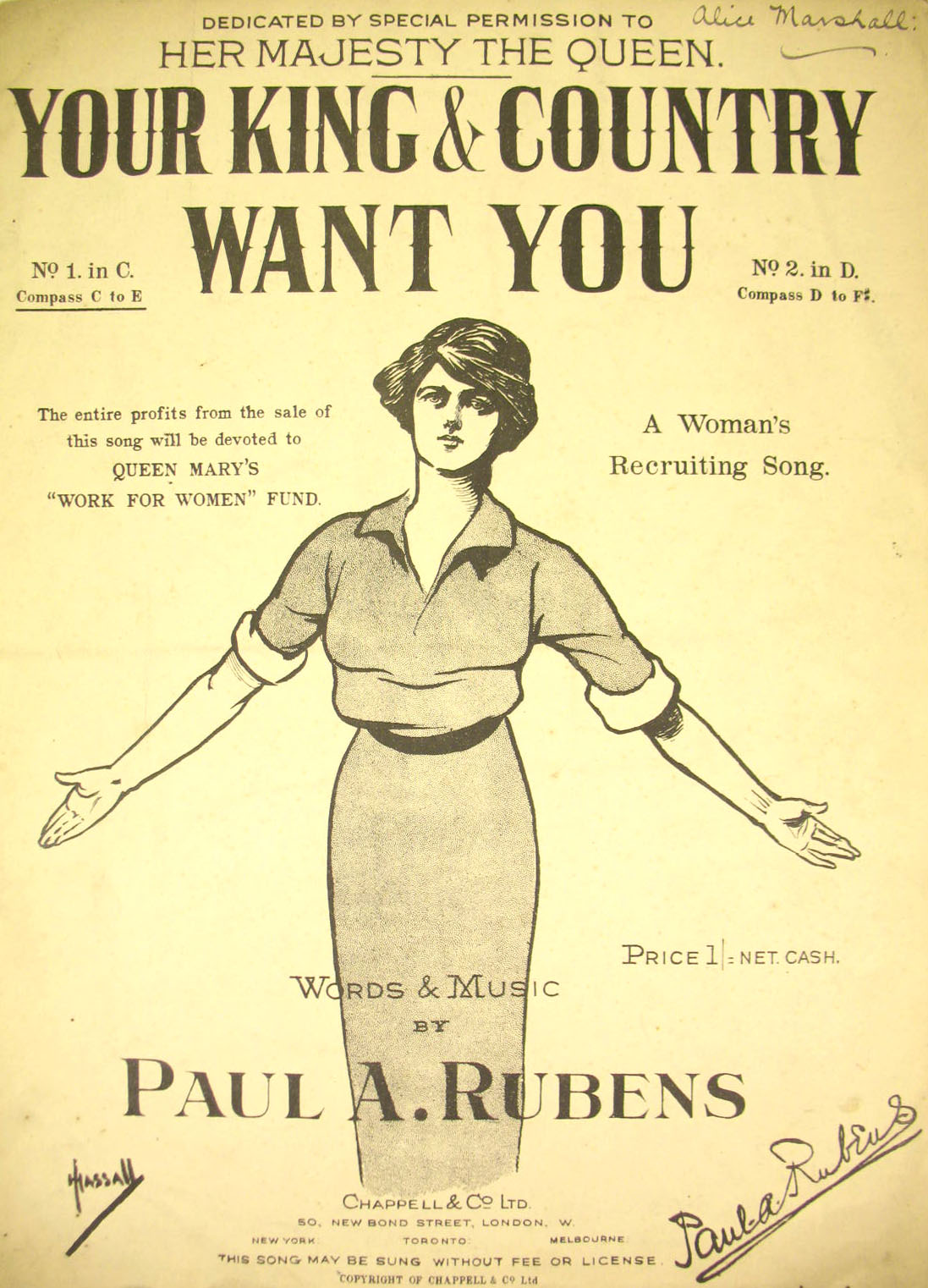
Original sheet music from 1914.

Several different recruiting songs with the name "Your King and Country Want/Need You" were popularised in Britain at the beginning of the First World War. Your King and Country Want You with words and music by Paul Rubens was published in London at the start of the war in 1914 by Chappell Music. It was written as a "Woman's Recruiting Song" to be sung with the intention of persuading men to volunteer to fight in the War. Profits from its sale were given to "Queen Mary's Work for Women Fund"; the song raised over half a million pounds for the fund.

== Lyrics ==
The song lyrics were written to be sung by a woman, but alternative words could be used (listed in brackets) if sung by a man or by a mixed ensemble. The following complete set of lyrics are taken from the original sheet music:

Verse 1:

We've watched you playing cricket And every kind of game
At football, golf and polo, You men have made your name,
But now your country calls you To play your part in war,
And no matter what befalls you, We shall love you all the more,
So come and join the forces As your fathers did before.

Refrain (to be sung after each verse):

Oh! we don't want to lose you but we think you ought to go
For your King and your Country both need you so;
We shall want you and miss you but with all our might and main
We shall cheer you, thank you, kiss you When you come back again.

Chorus (to be sung after each refrain):

Oh! we don't want to lose you but we think you ought to go
For your King and Country both need you so;
We shall want you and miss you but with all our might and main
We shall cheer you, thank you, kiss you When you come back again.

Verse 2:

We want you from all quarters So, help us, South and North
We want you in your thousands, From Falmouth to the Forth,
You'll never find us fail you When you are in distress,
So, answer when we hail you, And let your word be "Yes"
And so your name, in years to come Each mother's son shall bless.

Encore Verse:

It's easy for us women (people) To stay at home and shout,
But remember there's a duty To the men who first went out.
The odds against that handful Were nearly four to one,
And we cannot rest until It's man for man, and gun for gun!
And every woman's (body's) duty Is to see that duty done!

== Recordings ==
Artists who have recorded the song, and the record company and recording date (where known) include:

- Bessie Jones, HMV, 1914
- Helen Clark, Edison Diamond Disc 80232, 1914
- Edna Thornton, HMV, 1914
- Robert Howe, HMV, 1914
- Miss Ainell, HMV, 1914
- Stanley Kirkby, Regal, c. 1914
- Eileen Boyd, Jumbo, c. 1915
