= Whitchurch-on-Thames =

Oxfordshire village on The Thames

Coordinates: 51.490°N 1.087°W

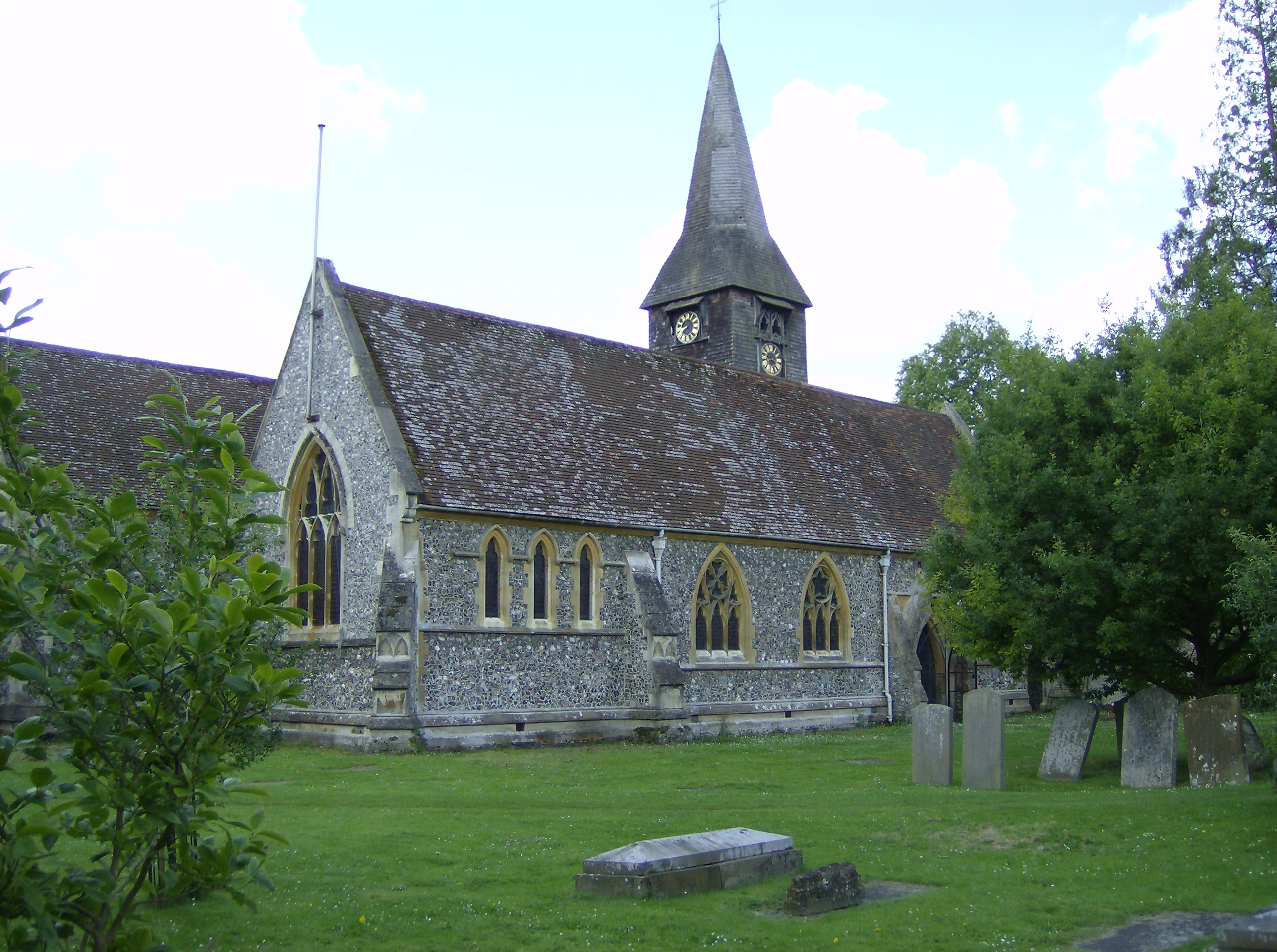
- Parish Church of St. Mary

- Location within Oxfordshire
- Area: 5.36 km^{2} (2.07 sq mi)
- Population: 758 (2001 census)
  - Density: 141/km^{2} (370/sq mi)
- OS grid reference: SU6377
- Civil parish: Whitchurch-on-Thames
- District: South Oxfordshire
- Shire county: Oxfordshire
- Region: South East
- Country: England
- Sovereign state: United Kingdom
- Post town: READING
- Postcode district: RG8
- Dialling code: 0118
- Police: Thames Valley
- Fire: Oxfordshire
- Ambulance: South Central
- UK Parliament: Henley and Thame
- Website: Whitchurch-on-Thames village

Whitchurch-on-Thames is a village and civil parish in the South Oxfordshire district, in Oxfordshire, England, on the bank of the River Thames, about 5.5 miles (9 km) northwest of Reading, Berkshire, in close proximity to Whitchurch Hill. Opposite Whitchurch on the Berkshire bank is the village of Pangbourne. In 2001 the parish had a population of 758.

== History ==
The Church of England parish church of Saint Mary was originally Norman, and was altered in the 15th century. In 1858 the Gothic Revival architect Henry Woodyer completely rebuilt the church, retaining only the Norman south door, Perpendicular Gothic south porch and a few other items. The parish is now a member of the Langtree Team Ministry: a Church of England benefice that also includes the parishes of Checkendon, Ipsden, North Stoke, Stoke Row and Woodcote.

Since the 16th century Whitchurch has had a weir and flash lock on the Thames to manage water levels for navigation. In 1787 the flash lock was replaced with a pound lock, Whitchurch Lock. The original Whitchurch Toll Bridge between Whitchurch and Pangbourne was built in 1792. The current structure, still privately owned, is the fourth on the site, the bridge having been reconstructed in 1853, 1902 and 2014. The current toll for a car to cross is 60 pence.

== Amenities ==
Whitchurch has a primary school. Whitchurch has two public houses, the Ferryboat and the Greyhound Inn.

== Sources ==
- Sherwood, Jennifer; Pevsner, Nikolaus (1974). Oxfordshire. The Buildings of England. Harmondsworth: Penguin Books. pp. 838–840. ISBN 0-14-071045-0.
