= Newnham Murren =

Hamlet in Oxfordshire, England

Coordinates: 51.596°N 1.116°W

- St Mary's Church, Newnham Murren

- Location within Oxfordshire
- OS grid reference: SU613888
- Civil parish: Crowmarsh
- District: South Oxfordshire
- Shire county: Oxfordshire
- Region: South East
- Country: England
- Sovereign state: United Kingdom
- Post town: Wallingford
- Postcode district: OX10
- Dialling code: 01491
- Police: Thames Valley
- Fire: Oxfordshire
- Ambulance: South Central
- UK Parliament: Henley

Newnham Murren is a hamlet in the civil parish of Crowmarsh, in the South Oxfordshire district, in the county of Oxfordshire, England. It is in the Thames Valley, about 0.5 miles (800 m) east of the market town of Wallingford. Newnham Murren is now contiguous with the village of Crowmarsh Gifford. It has a church called St Mary's Church.

== History ==
Newnham Murren is an ancient parish, recorded in the Domesday Book of 1086 as Niweham. The Church of England parish church of St Mary was built in the 12th century. Newnham Murren was a strip parish: a thin strip of land extending into the Chiltern Hills including part of Stoke Row. Newnham Murren was made a civil parish in the 19th century, but on 1 April 1932 the civil parish was absorbed into the new civil parish of Crowmarsh. In 1931 the parish had a population of 249.
