= Clara Butt =

British singer (1872–1936)

Dame Clara Butt DBE
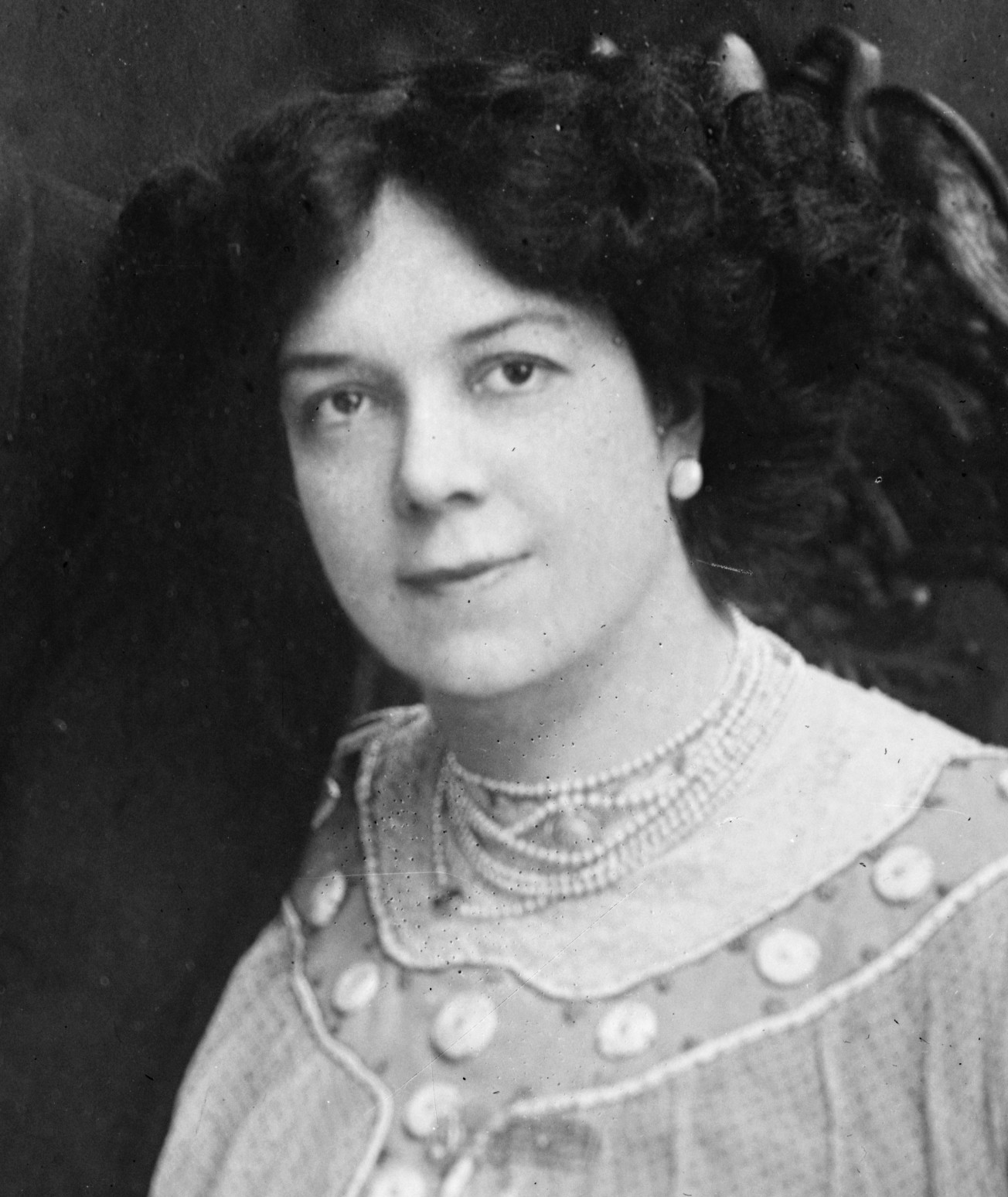
- Born: 1 February 1872; Southwick, Sussex, England
- Died: 23 January 1936 (aged 63); North Stoke, Oxfordshire, England
- Education: Royal College of Music
- Occupation: Singer
- Years active: 1892–1936
- Height: 6ft 2in (188cm)
- Spouse: Kennerley Rumford (m. 1900)
- Children: 3
- Relatives: Lawson Butt (brother)
- Clara Butt in 1911 Land of Hope and Glory sung by Butt in 1911

Dame Clara Ellen Butt DBE (1 February 1872 – 23 January 1936) was an English dramatic contralto and one of the most popular singers from the 1890s through to the 1930s. She had an exceptionally fine contralto voice and an agile singing technique, and impressed contemporary composers such as Saint-Saëns and Elgar; the latter composed his Sea Pictures, Op. 37 with her voice in mind.

Her main career was as a recitalist and concert singer. She appeared in only two operatic productions, both of Gluck's Orfeo ed Euridice. Later in her career she frequently appeared in recitals together with her husband, the baritone Kennerley Rumford. She made numerous recordings for the gramophone.

Besides singing in many important festivals and concerts, she appeared by royal command before Queen Victoria and Kings Edward VII and George V. She made tours of Australia, Japan, Canada, New Zealand, Africa, India, Hong Kong, the United States and to many European cities. Wherever she went, she was greeted with acclaim. Every performance sold out, and audiences responded with great enthusiasm. This remarkable success continued until the end of her career.

== Early life and career ==
Clara Butt was born in Southwick, Sussex, the eldest daughter of Henry Albert Butt, a sea captain, and his wife Clara née Hook. In 1880, the family moved to the port city of Bristol where her brother, Lawson was born. Clara Butt was educated at South Bristol High School, where her singing ability was recognised and her talent as a performer encouraged. At the request of her headmistress, she was trained by the bass Daniel Rootham (father of the composer Cyril Rootham) and joined the Bristol Festival Chorus, of which Daniel Rootham was musical director.

Butt won a scholarship to the Royal College of Music (RCM) in January 1890. Her voice teachers were John Henry Blower and Albert Visetti, while her piano teacher was Marmaduke Barton. During her fourth year of vocal lessons at the college she spent three months studying in Paris sponsored by Queen Victoria. She also studied in Berlin and Italy.

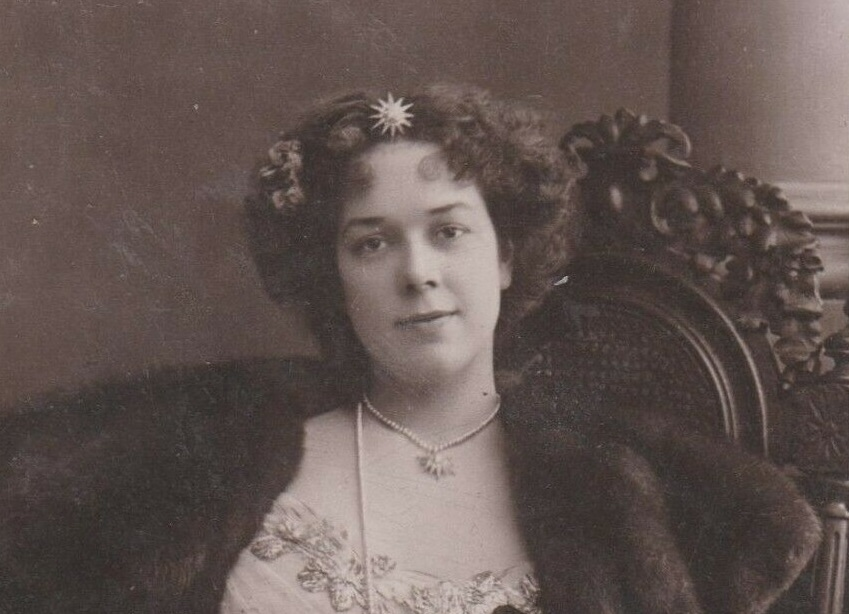
Clara Butt in 1898

Butt made her professional debut on 7 December 1892 at the Royal Albert Hall in London in Sullivan's cantata The Golden Legend. Three days later she appeared as Orfeo in Gluck's Orfeo ed Euridice at the Lyceum Theatre. This was an RCM production, conducted by Charles Villiers Stanford. George Bernard Shaw, who was then the music critic for The World, wrote that she "far surpassed the utmost expectations that could reasonably be entertained", and forecast a considerable career for her.

Later Butt polished her skills in Berlin with the famous retired soprano Etelka Gerster. The French composer Camille Saint-Saëns heard her, and wanted her to study his opera Samson et Dalila, but at the time the representation of biblical subjects on the British stage was forbidden, and nothing came of it. When the law changed and the work was given at Covent Garden in 1909 the part of Delila was sung by Kirkby Lunn, to Butt's disappointment. In 1896 she took a break from singing and returned to Paris for further vocal studies, this time under Jacques Bouhy.

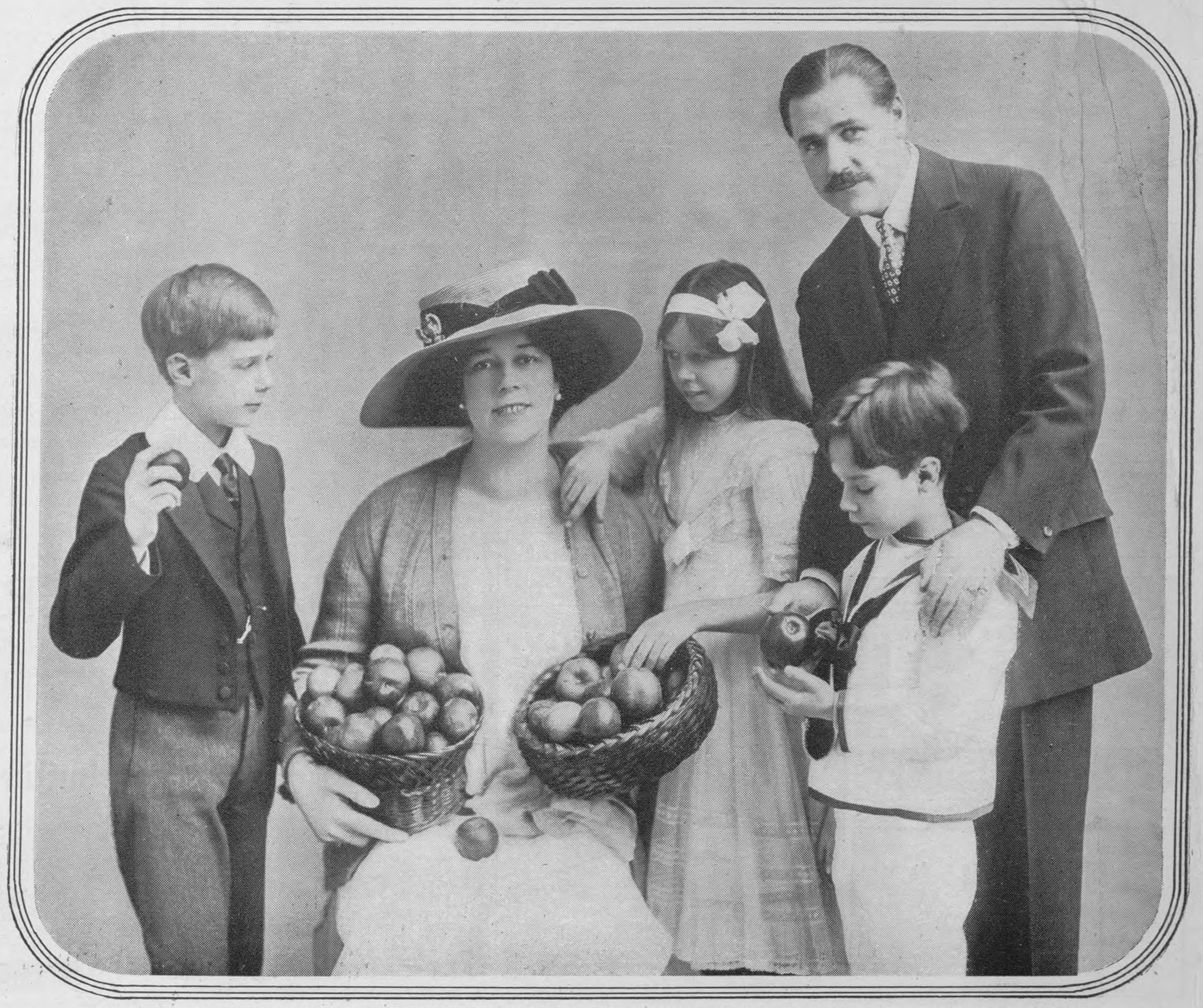
Butt, Kennerley Rumford, children (1914)

Butt acquired a reputation in Britain for her vocal attributes and her physical presence on the concert platform: she was 6 feet 2 inches tall. She made many gramophone recordings, often accompanied by the (uncredited) pianist Lilian Bryant. Among her recordings are several of Sullivan's song "The Lost Chord"; her friend Fanny Ronalds bequeathed the original manuscript of the song to her. (Note: A copy of "The Lost Chord" was buried with Ronalds but the D'Oyly Carte conductor David Mackie notes that Mrs. Ronalds bequeathed the original manuscript to Butt. In 1950, Rumford, Butt's widower, gave the manuscript to the Worshipful Company of Musicians, which still owns it.) She was primarily a concert singer; her only operatic performances were in two productions of Orfeo ed Euridice. She also sang ballads by popular composers like Thomas Arthur Goring and Elva Lorence (Florence Eva Simpson). The leading composer of the era, Edward Elgar, composed his song-cycle Sea Pictures for contralto and orchestra with her in mind as soloist; she sang at the first performance of the work at the Norwich Festival on 5 October 1899, with the composer conducting.

== Marriage and family ==
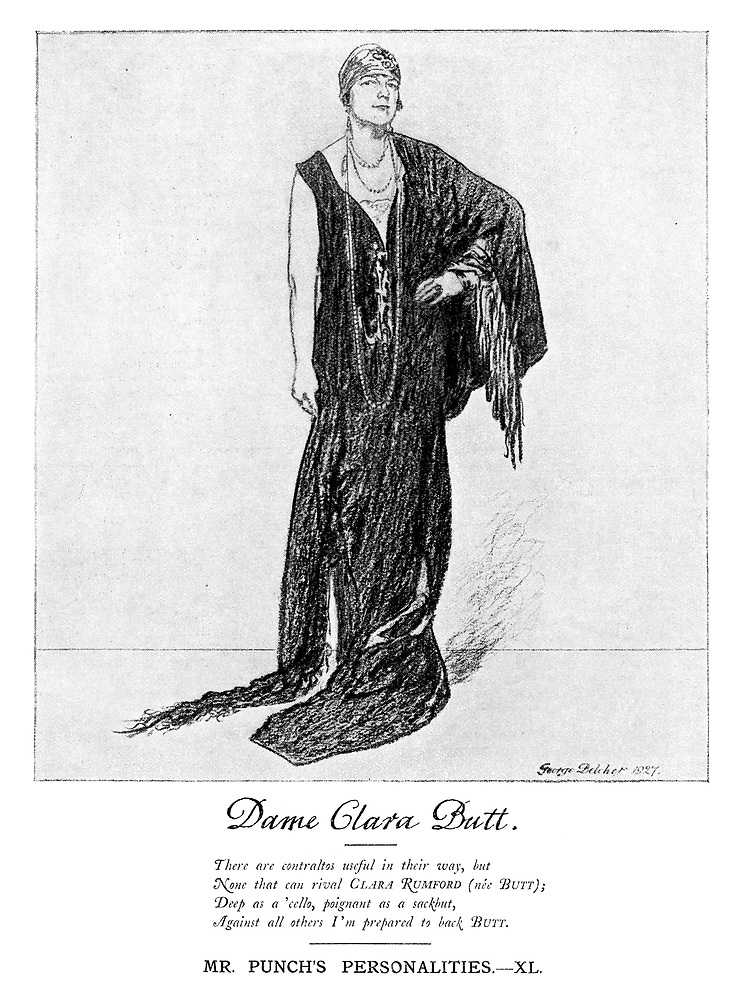
Clara Butt (1927, Punch)

On 24 March 1900 Butt performed at the Bournemouth Winter Gardens with the baritone Kennerley Rumford, (Note: Real name Robert Henry Rumford) and they were married in Bristol on 26 June 1900.

Thereafter Butt would often appear with him in concerts. They had a daughter, Joy, in 1901, who, in 1928 married Claude H. Cross (no issue), and they also had two sons, Roy (1904–1923) and Victor (1906–1934).

== Later life ==
During the First World War, Butt organised and sang in many concerts for service charities, and for this was appointed Dame Commander of the Order of the British Empire (DBE) in the 1920 civilian war honours. That year she sang four performances of Gluck's Orfeo ed Euridice at Covent Garden, with Miriam Licette, under the baton of Sir Thomas Beecham. According to The Times she was ill at ease on stage, and in the most famous number, "Che farò senza Euridice", her "attempt to sing it dramatically made her play fast and loose with the time and spoil the phrasing". It was her only appearance on the professional operatic stage.

Clara Butt performed 110 times at the Royal Albert Hall in her career, organising many important fund-raising concerts for charities during the First World War. She sang The Dream of Gerontius with the Australian contralto Eileen Boyd for King George V and Queen Mary in 1917.

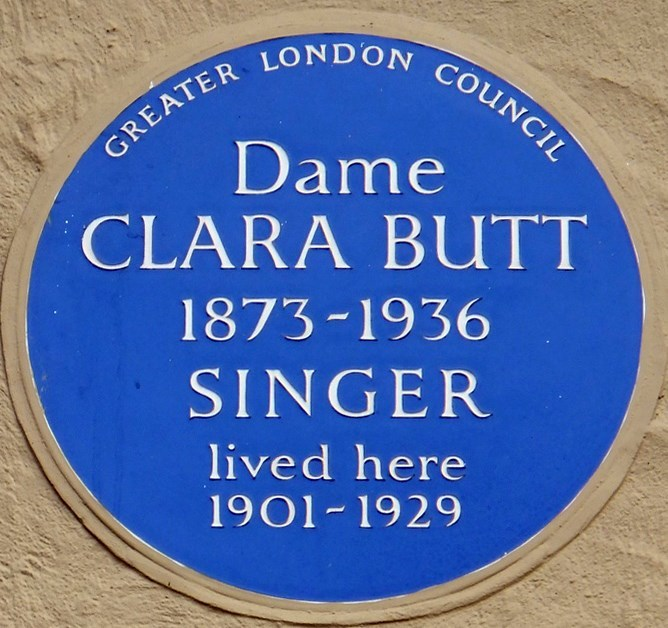
Greater London Council blue plaque

Butt's three sisters were also singers. One, Ethel Hook, became a famous contralto in her own right, made some solo recordings, and in 1926 appeared in an early sound film made in the Lee de Forest Phonofilm sound-on-film process.

She was clouded by tragedy in her later years, with both her sons predeceasing her. During the 1920s, she became seriously ill with spinal cancer. Nevertheless, she continued to give concerts and make records. A devout Christian Scientist, she took part in revivalist meetings, singing, and giving sermons. She died at North Stoke on 23 January 1936.

== Notes ==
=== Sources ===
- Ainger, Michael (2002). Gilbert and Sullivan – A Dual Biography. Oxford: Oxford University Press. ISBN 0195147693.
- Leonard, Maurice (2012). Hope and Glory: A Life of Dame Clara Butt. Brighton: Victorian Secrets. ISBN 978-1906469382.
- Mackie, David (2006). Arthur Sullivan and The Royal Society of Musicians. London: Royal Society of Musicians of Great Britain. ISBN 0950948136.
- Shaw, George Bernard (1898). Dan H. Laurence (ed.). Shaw's Music – The Complete Music Criticism of Bernard Shaw. Vol. 2. London: The Bodley Head.
