= Mongewell =

Village in Oxfordshire, England

Coordinates: 51.586°N 1.119°W

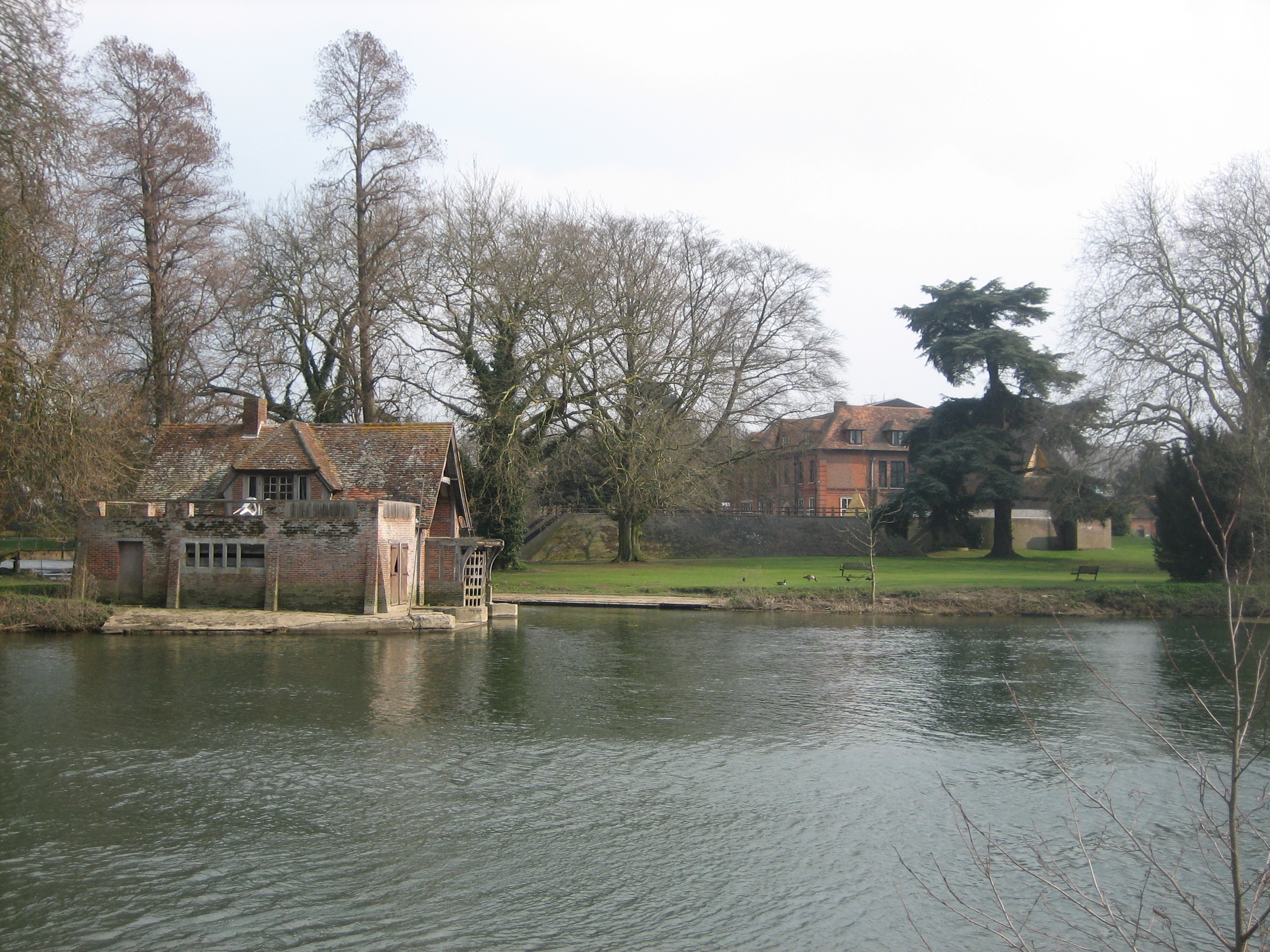
- Mongewell Park

- Location within Oxfordshire
- OS grid reference: SU611877
- Civil parish: Crowmarsh
- District: South Oxfordshire
- Shire county: Oxfordshire
- Region: South East
- Country: England
- Sovereign state: United Kingdom
- Post town: Wallingford
- Postcode district: OX10
- Police: Thames Valley
- Fire: Oxfordshire
- Ambulance: South Central
- UK Parliament: Henley

Mongewell is a village in the civil parish of Crowmarsh in the South Oxfordshire district, in Oxfordshire, England, about 1 mile (1.6 km) south of Wallingford. Mongewell is on the east bank of the Thames, linked with the west bank at Winterbrook by Winterbrook Bridge. The earthwork Grim's Ditch, now part of The Ridgeway long-distance footpath, passes through the northern part of it and is a scheduled ancient monument. It has a church called St John the Baptist's Church.

== History ==
The ancient earthwork of Grim's Ditch has its main section north of the village, a Scheduled Ancient Monument. In order to provide a level climb up to the first major hill of the long Chiltern Hills range to the east and northeast, this has embankments and cuttings, with thousands of tonnes of earth displaced perhaps in the Bronze Age in order to facilitate access by foot.

The place-name 'Mongewell' is first attested in an Anglo-Saxon will circa 966–75, where it appears as Mundingwillæ. It appears as Mongewel in the Domesday Book of 1086, and as Mungewell in the Book of Fees in 1242. The name means 'the spring or stream of Munda's people'.

The parish of Mongewell was mentioned in Domesday Book. The parish church of St John the Baptist dates architecturally to the 12th century, with later repairs and additions. Mongewell was a strip parish, a thin strip of land extending into the Chiltern Hills including part of Stoke Row. The ecclesiastical parish was joined by a civil parish in the 19th century, but on 1 April 1932 was split, mostly joining a new civil parish named Crowmarsh, but a small part was added to Rotherfield Greys parish. In 1931 the parish had a population of 129.

== Mongewell Park ==
Mongewell Park was once home to Shute Barrington, Bishop of Llandaff (1769–1782). Replacing the original Georgian Mongewell House of Barrington, a large brick mansion in William and Mary style was built in 1890 for Alexander Frazer whose initials can be seen on the lodge gates (Pedgley and Pedgley, 1990). After Fraser died in 1916, the house became a hospital for wounded officers in World War I. In 1918, it was sold to the American millionaire Howard Gould.

He sold the house in 1939 and the Royal Air Force occupied it until 1945. In January 1944 it became the headquarters for No 2 Group RAF of Bomber Command led by Air Vice Marshal Basil Embry. On the staff there for six months before his capture as a POW was the World War II night fighter ace, Wing Commander Bob Braham (Braham, 1984). At the end of the war the house was once more used as a hospital before becoming derelict. A Jewish boarding school, Carmel College, occupied Mongewell Park from 1948 to 1997. The school added several buildings, including its synagogue and the Julius Gottlieb Gallery and Boathouse, which were later listed. As of June 2007, it was planned to redevelop the site for housing.
