= Ipsden =

Village in Oxfordshire, England

Coordinates: 51.566°N 1.083°W

- Location within Oxfordshire
- Area: 11.00 km^{2} (4.25 sq mi)
- Population: 325 (2011 census)
  - Density: 30/km^{2} (78/sq mi)
- OS grid reference: SU6385
- Civil parish: Ipsden
- District: South Oxfordshire
- Shire county: Oxfordshire
- Region: South East
- Country: England
- Sovereign state: United Kingdom
- Post town: Wallingford
- Postcode district: OX10
- Dialling code: 01491
- Police: Thames Valley
- Fire: Oxfordshire
- Ambulance: South Central
- UK Parliament: Henley and Thame
- Website: Ipsden Village

Ipsden is a small village and civil parish in the Chiltern Hills in South Oxfordshire, about 3 miles (5 km) southeast of Wallingford. It is almost equidistant from Oxford and Reading, Berkshire.

== Parish church ==
The Church of England parish church of Saint Mary the Virgin was built late in the 12th century as a chapelry of North Stoke. It is said to have been the replacement for an earlier church that fell into disrepair in that century. The north aisle of the present church was built in the 12th century and retains a Norman window. The chancel arch is 13th century and the present south doorway is 14th century. There had been a south aisle but this has been lost and its arcade blocked up. Perpendicular Gothic windows occupy the south wall of the nave where the arcade had been. The chancel east window is also Perpendicular Gothic. The south porch was added in 1634 and the belfry in the 19th century. It is of five bays and built of red brick with a pattern of blue bricks.

St. Mary the Virgin parish is now a member of The Langtree Team Ministry: a benefice that also includes the parishes of Checkendon, North Stoke, Stoke Row, Whitchurch-on-Thames and Woodcote. The date of the vicarage has been disputed: the former Department of the Environment (DoE) dated it to 1643 but the architectural historians Jennifer Sherwood and Sir Nikolaus Pevsner considered 1700 to be more likely.

== Ipsden House ==
Ipsden House was built in the 17th century. It was remodelled in the 18th century, probably 1764 which is the date on the rainwater heads, and one wing was gothicised in 1800. In the grounds is a dovecote that the Department of the Environment dated to the 15th century but Sherwood and Nikolaus Pevsner considered to be 17th century. Early in the 19th century Ipsden House was the home of John and Anne-Marie Reade. Their son Charles Reade, born at Ipsden in 1814, became a novelist and dramatist. In 1823 their second daughter, Julia Susanna, was married to the missionary Allen Francis Gardiner (1794–1851).

Their other son, John Thurlow Reade died in India in 1827, and there is a pyramidal stone monument to him in a field around 0.5 miles (800 m) north of Ipsden House. Another member of the family, the historian and explorer William Winwood Reade (1838–75), is buried in St Mary's churchyard. Between 1930 and 1939, Ipsden House was the home of novelist Rosamond Lehmann and her husband Wogan Philipps, 2nd Baron Milford. Close to the house is a small stone circle, druidical in style. It is not ancient but was created in 1827.

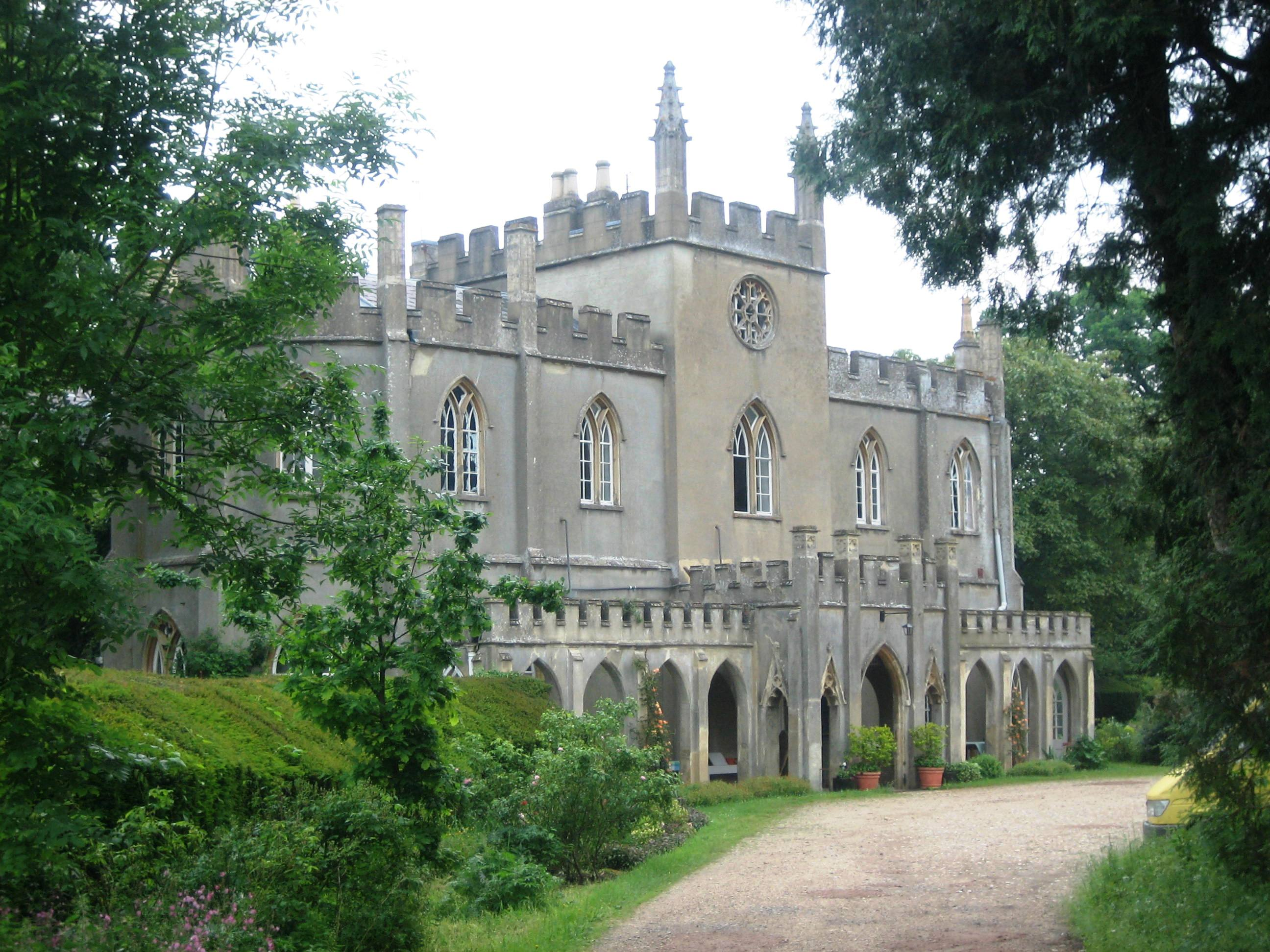
Braziers Park House

== Braziers Park ==
Braziers Park was built late in the 17th century: a date-stone in the cellar says 1688. It was gothicised and ornamentally castellated in about 1799 by the builder and architect Daniel Harris. It is now a Grade II* listed building. Since 1950 it has been the premises of an educational trust, the Braziers Park School of Integrative Social Research. Since 2008 Braziers park has hosted the annual Wood festival.

== Other historic features ==
=== Ipsden Farm Barn ===
Ipsden Farm, just west of the village, has an 18th-century barn built of brick on an L-shaped plan with roofs that are tiled and hipped. The barn is unusually large, being built of 24 bays and having five entrance porches. It is a Grade II listed building.

=== Richard Boyle ===
The Olympic rower Richard Boyle was born at Ipsden in 1888. Eric Roll, Baron Roll of Ipsden (1907–2005) lived at Ipsden.

=== Ipsden Well ===
This well is situated next to the church and dates from 1865. It was presented to the community of Ipsden by an Indian gentleman named Maharaja Sir Deonarayun Singh, a year after the well at Stoke Row opened. It remained in use until piped water arrived in 1948.

== Amenities ==
Ipsden has a post office and village store. Ipsden had a former village school in a part of the village called Newtown. It is now a pre-school for children 3–5 years old. Ipsden has a village hall, an amateur dramatic company and a cricket club. The parish includes the hamlet of Hailey, immediately north of Ipsden village. Hailey has a public house, the King William IV. The parish includes Well Place, which used to have a zoo but has now closed down.

== Sources ==
- Sherwood, Jennifer; Pevsner, Nikolaus (1974). Oxfordshire. The Buildings of England. Harmondsworth: Penguin Books. pp. 662–664. ISBN 0-14-071045-0.
