= North Stoke, Oxfordshire =

Village in Oxfordshire, England

Coordinates: 51.571°N 1.120°W

North Stoke
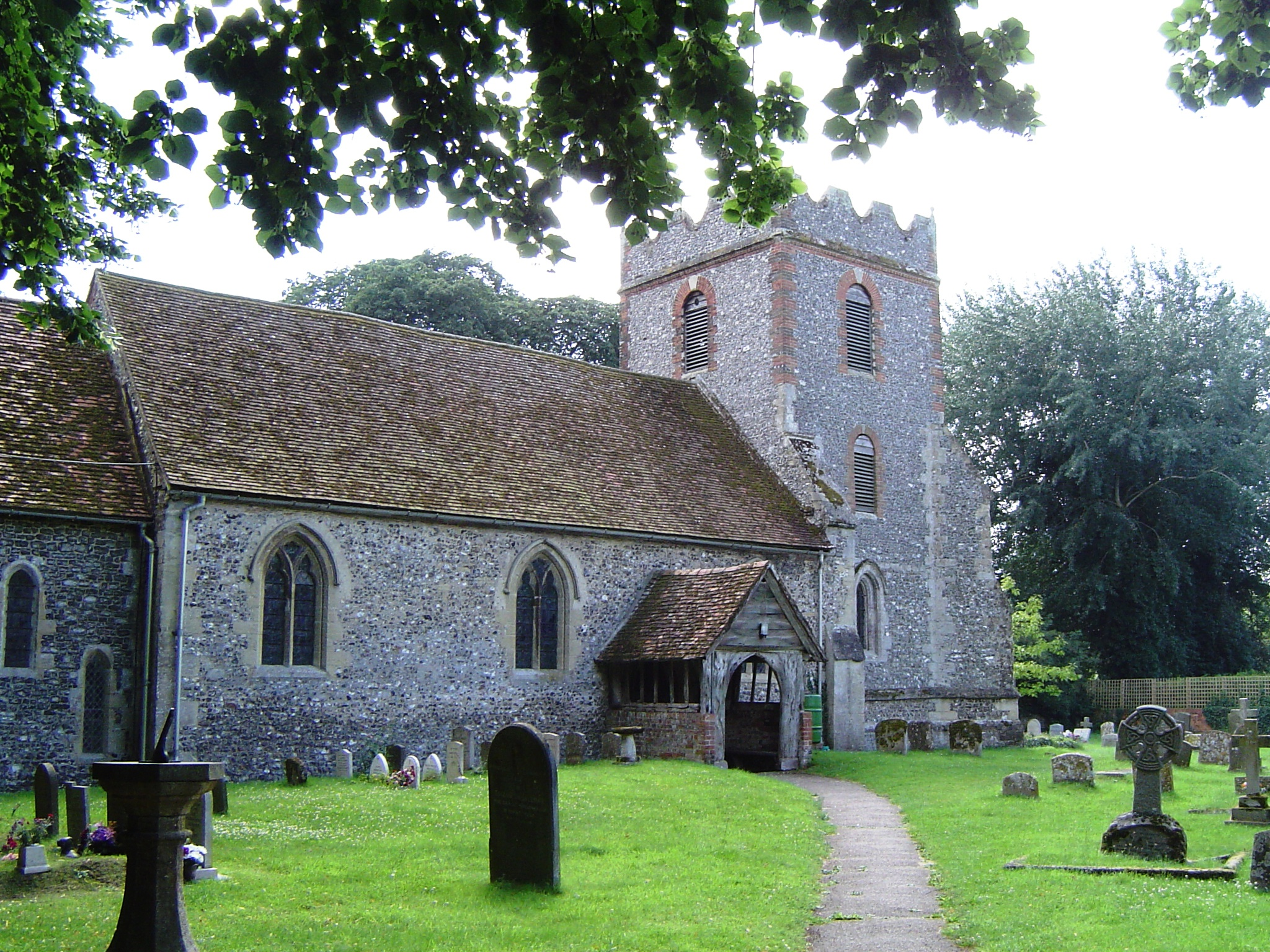
- St. Mary's parish church

- Location within Oxfordshire
- OS grid reference: SU6186
- Civil parish: Crowmarsh
- District: South Oxfordshire
- Shire county: Oxfordshire
- Region: South East
- Country: England
- Sovereign state: United Kingdom
- Post town: Wallingford
- Postcode district: OX10
- Dialling code: 01491
- Police: Thames Valley
- Fire: Oxfordshire
- Ambulance: South Central
- UK Parliament: Henley

North Stoke is a small village beside the River Thames in the civil parish of Crowmarsh, in the South Oxfordshire district, in the county of Oxfordshire, England, 2 miles (3.2 km) south of the market town of Wallingford. Its 'Church of St Mary' is a Grade I listed building. In 1931 the parish had a population of 190. On 1 April 1932 the parish was abolished to form Crowmarsh. The town currently holds a population of 227.

== Etymology ==
In the name North Stoke, stoke means "stockaded (place)" that is staked with more than just boundary-marking stakes.

== Parish church ==
The Church of England parish church of Saint Mary was built in the 1230s when Robert de Esthall was the vicar. His memorial slab (1274) may be seen in the chancel. There are the remains of a Saxon piscina and rumours that the chest in the chancel is a 13th-century crusader chest. Most notable, however, are the large number of 14th-century wall paintings. Consequent on these factors, it is Grade I listed. The original tower collapsed in 1669 and was not rebuilt until 1725. St. Mary's parish is now a member of The Langtree Team Ministry: a Church of England benefice that also includes the parishes of Checkendon, Ipsden, Stoke Row, Whitchurch-on-Thames and Woodcote. The Ridgeway path runs through the churchyard, to either side crossing the river Thames and climbing the Chilterns.

== Transport ==
The village is a two forked dead-end residential road against the river Thames. However it is closer to the New Town end and has a lakeside Hotel and Golf Course which may be used by its visitors. From 6 June 2012, North Stoke is served by Go Ride bus service number 134 from Wallingford to Goring-on-Thames. Private homes and a private boathouse join the river, no public slipway is available. The Thames Path is on the opposite bank.

== Notable people ==
- The Academy Award winning actor Michael Caine lived at Rectory Farmhouse.
- The contralto Dame Clara Butt lived and died in the village. She is buried in the churchyard.
- Rock vocalist Ian Gillan, formerly of Deep Purple, used to live in the country house that is now the Springs Hotel. He had the guitar-shaped swimming pool built.

== Bibliography ==
- Pedgley, B; Pedgley, D. (1990). Crowmarsh – A history of Crowmarsh Gifford, Newnham Murren, Mongewell and North Stoke. Crowmarsh History Group. ISBN 0-9516305-0-4.
- Sherwood, Jennifer; Pevsner, Nikolaus (1974). Oxfordshire. The Buildings of England. Harmondsworth: Penguin Books. pp. 723–724. ISBN 0-14-071045-0.
