= Carmel College, Oxfordshire =

Jewish boarding school in England

Coordinates: 51.5853°N 1.1212°W

Carmel College

Location
- Mongewell Park; Wallingford, Oxfordshire, OX10 8BT; England

Information
- Type: Public School
- Motto: בכל דרך דעהו (Know Him (God) in All Thy Ways)
- Religious affiliation: Judaism
- Established: 1948; 78 years ago
- Founder: Kopul Rosen
- Closed: 1997
- Gender: Boys
- Age range: 11–18

Carmel College was founded in 1948 as a British, Jewish boarding school for boys, modelled on British public schools. In later years it was, to some extent, co-educational, and there were a few non-Jewish day pupils. It closed down in 1997.

Carmel College alumni are known as "Old Carmelis"; in 1973 the school was referred to as the "Jewish Eton" by The Observer correspondent, Chaim Bermant.

== History and general information ==
The school was founded in 1948 by Rabbi Dr Yaacov Kopul Rosen; "there were about 25 pupils." It was first situated at Greenham Common near Newbury, Berkshire, and then at Mongewell Park near Wallingford, Oxfordshire. When it moved, it had "about 200 pupils." It was then one of the UK's three Jewish boarding schools, the others being in Gateshead and Whittingehame College in Hove.

The school thrived under its founder (1948–1962) and through the early 70's (tenure of David Stamler; "Jewish Eton"). It was closed in July 1997, mainly owing to diminishing pupil numbers and financial difficulties, having been affected by the proposed termination of government assisted places by the new Labour government and the rise of the Jewish Day School Movement. The grounds were sold to property developers for an undisclosed sum. The sale was overturned by the Charity Commission, however, following significant pressure from parents and former students who claimed the land was undersold. The distinctive concrete synagogue, with its stained glass windows created by Israeli artist Nehemia Azaz, the dining hall, and the amphitheatre, designed by local architect Thomas Hancock, are Grade II listed buildings; the Julius Gottlieb gallery and boathouse, designed by Sir Basil Spence, is Grade II* listed.

When it closed, the school was attended by children from the age of 11 to 18 – although earlier there had been a preparatory school which took children from around the age of 8. Later a girls' school was built about a mile from the main campus, although the buildings were never actually used for this purpose. Instead, it was turned into a junior school in the late 1960s for children up to the age of 13, when they moved to the main school. The junior school was closed down several years before Carmel, and the buildings sold. Girls were later admitted into the main school, starting at the sixth form in 1968. Daughters of teachers at the school had been admitted before this, including the daughter of David Stamler (headmaster) and founder, Rabbi Kopul Rosen's youngest daughter, the school's first female students.

The principals or headmasters were: the founder, Kopul Rosen, until his death in 1962; David Stamler, 1962–71; Kopul Rosen's eldest son, Jeremy Rosen, 1971–84; and Philip Skelker, until the school closed. After David Stamler resigned (ostensibly due to health reasons), two interim headmasters were appointed. The first, Joshua Gabay, left after a few months - when he learned that he would not become the new headmaster. (He subsequently moved back to Gibraltar where he was elected to the Gibraltar House of Assembly, between 1996 and 2000 (1996 Gibraltar general election),). Following Gabay, Ron Evans, head of Mathematics, took over until Rabbi Jeremy Rosen's appointment.

Boarding fees in 1996 were £10,000 per school term, £30,000 per year. From 1990 it was the most expensive boarding school in the country. There were many students from abroad, especially in later years, and some scholarships. Many students went on to university, including major universities in Britain and overseas.

When the school closed, many pupils were transferred to a boarding school in Bristol, Clifton College, which until May 2005 had a Jewish boarding house.

The school practised a mainstream Orthodox Judaism, more Orthodox than the practice of most of the pupils' families. The aim was to turn out students who were informed Jews, but also aware of secular modes of thought.

The school was strong in mathematics and science subjects, with a chemistry department developed by the innovative chemistry master Romney Coles, author of the book Chemistry Diagrams, illustrating industrial chemical processes. Coles had the position of Headmaster when Kopul Rosen was Principal. Roy Evans, who was Headmaster for a few months, was involved in the School Mathematics Project (SMP) which was used for Mathematics teaching at the school.School Mathematics Project

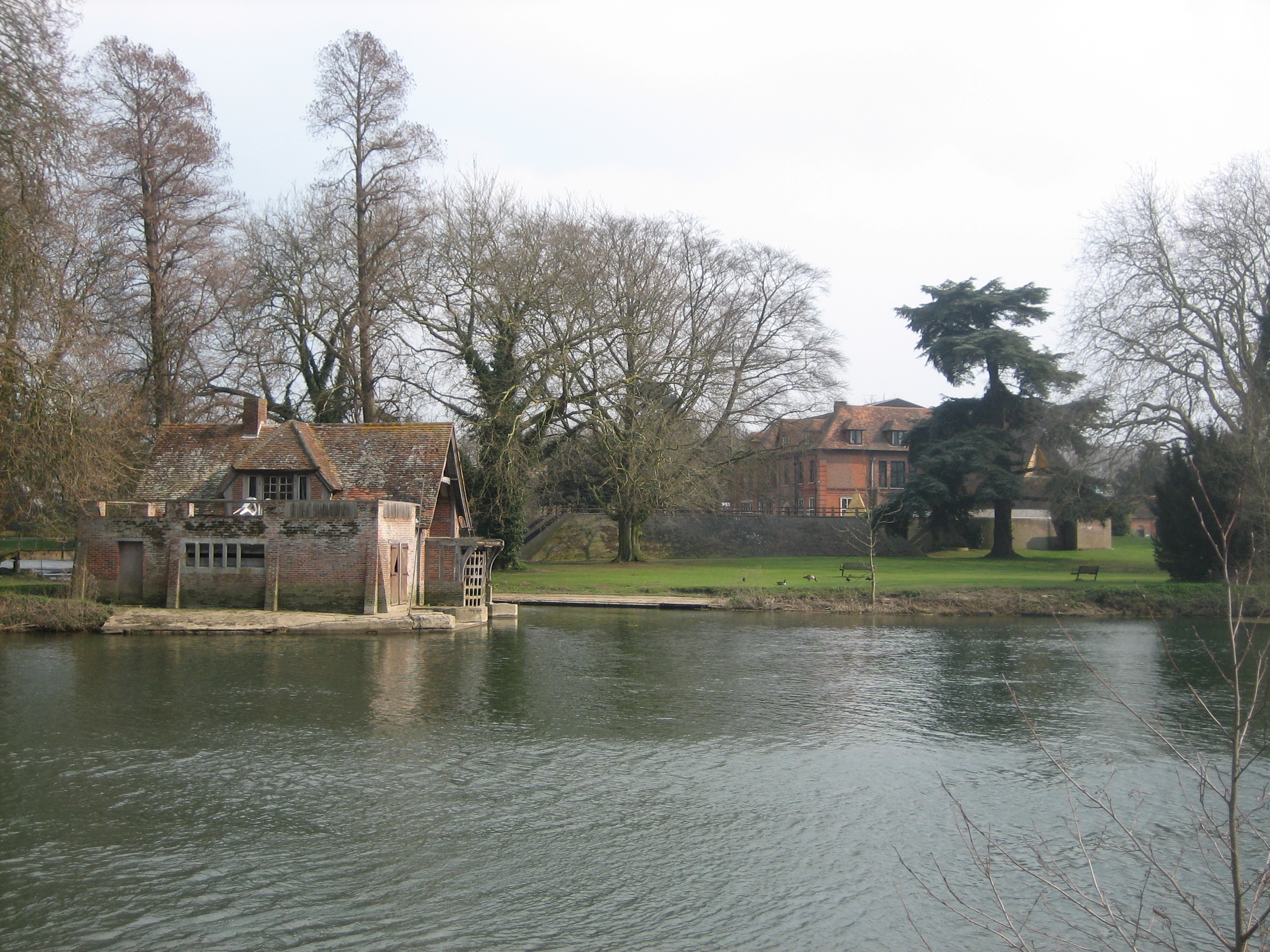
Mongewell Park, where the school was situated

There is a history of the school's early days: Carmel College in the Kopul Era: A History of Carmel College, September 1948-March 1962.

In October 2015 former housemaster Trevor Bolton was convicted of abusing boys at the school over a period of 20 years.

== Location ==
The school grounds in Mongewell Park had the straightest run of the River Thames flowing past it, and Oxford University made full use of this during their preparation for the annual Boat Race.

== Notable people connected with Carmel College ==
- Spencer Batiste, MP, later Immigration Appeal Tribunal chairman
- Jeremy Coller, financial executive
- David Dangoor DL, businessman and philanthropist
- Raymond Dwek, scientist
- Matthew Engel, journalist, formerly Editor of Wisden
- Stephen Endelman, composer
- Philip Green, British businessman, owner of the Arcadia Group
- Roland Joffé, English-French film director
- Harvey Lisberg, talent manager and impresario
- Edward Luttwak, strategic analyst and historian
- Houda Nonoo, Ambassador of Bahrain to the United States from 2008 to 2013
- Murray Roston, teacher at Carmel College, later professor at Bar-Ilan University, Israel
- Ray Singer, record producer
- Kenny Wax, theatre producer

== In popular culture ==
The Mansion House was an old manor house with particular significance. Agatha Christie (who lived nearby in Wallingford) used it as the basis for the mansion in her 1952 play The Mousetrap. The headmaster's study was also the room used for the final briefing of the reconnaissance mission following the Dam Busters raid. There is a pillbox on the school grounds, beside the river.

A scene in the 2011 film The Iron Lady, where Margaret Thatcher is perfecting her prime-ministerial voice, was shot on location in the synagogue of Carmel College.

In 2013 and 2014 Kylie Minogue and the Kaiser Chiefs shot videos in the school's gym.

In the 2016 film, Mindhorn, the Carmel College synagogue is used as the location for scenes depicting the exterior and interior of fictional civic hall offices on the Isle of Man (approx timestamp 00:53:40 and 01:08:40).

The science fiction film, Annihilation (2018), starring Natalie Portman, uses the Carmel College swimming pool and other areas for scenes involving the Fort Amaya military base (approx timestamp 00:42:05-00:49:05).

In 2017, the library of the mansion house was used for filming interior scenes of Stalin's living quarters in the film The Death of Stalin.

In 2018, the art room in the teaching block, the interior of the Julius Gottlieb Gallery, the exterior and interior of the mansion house, the lake and the ruined church were used in scenes from BBC's production of John le Carré's The Little Drummer Girl.

In 2020, the pool was used for the cover of the album Build a Problem by Dodie, as well as in photoshoots.

== See also ==
- Fridolin Friedmann
