= Kenny & the Dragon =

2008 novel by Tony DiTerlizzi

- Author: Tony DiTerlizzi
- Language: English
- Publication date: 2008

Kenny & the Dragon is a 2008 children's novel by Tony DiTerlizzi and is based on the story of The Reluctant Dragon. DiTerlizzi named the two protagonists Kenneth and Grahame, after the original story's author Kenneth Grahame. He also included references to Grahame's other famous work, The Wind in the Willows.

== Plot ==
Kenny Rabbit is a young bunny that lives in a village called Roundbrook and enjoys reading. He is informed from his father that a dragon has moved to the hill by his parents' farm. The dragon, Grahame, loves literature, enjoys reciting long poems over dinner, and only uses his fire-breathing abilities to torch crème brûlée through his left nostril and he is a rarity among dragons. At school, Kenny accidentally says that he saw a dragon. When the villagers hear of it, they panic. A retired knight (George), who is Kenny's best friend, has been hired to slay Grahame. Kenny wants to keep his two friends from fighting or killing each other, but no one will listen to him. Kenny quickly came up with a way to convince them that they would become best friends if they gotten to know each other.

== Reception ==
Publishers Weekly wrote: "DiTerlizzi's novel is light-hearted and his informal pencil sketches enhance the creative interpretation of what would otherwise be an animal story. Some readers might struggle with the mannered vocabulary, which encompasses words like "drake" and "varlet", and Beowulf references will probably be lost on the intended audience. Regardless, readers will understand the author's message: make friends, not unfair judgments". Kirkus Reviews called it "a readable, if denatured, rendition of a faded classic". The School Library Journal also praised the book.
