= The Reluctant Dragon & Mr. Toad Show =

1970 Rankin/Bass animated television series

- Genre: Comedy
- Based on: Characters by Kenneth Grahame
- Written by: Romeo Muller; William J. Keenan
- Directed by: Arthur Rankin Jr. Jules Bass
- Voices of: Paul Soles; Donna Miller; Claude Rae; Carl Banas
- Composers: Maury Laws; Jules Bass
- Countries of origin: United States (production); Canada (voice actors); Japan (animation)
- Original language: English
- No. of seasons: 1
- No. of episodes: 17

Production
- Producers: Arthur Rankin Jr. Jules Bass
- Cinematography: Steve Nakagawa
- Editor: Irwin Goldress
- Running time: 30 minutes
- Production companies: Rankin/Bass Productions; Animation: Mushi Production

Original release
- Network: ABC
- Release: September 12 – December 26, 1970

The Reluctant Dragon & Mr. Toad Show is a 1970 American animated television series that aired on ABC's Saturday morning schedule. The show features two characters created by British children's writer Kenneth Grahame: the Reluctant Dragon from the 1898 short story of the same name, and Mr. Toad from the 1908 novel The Wind in the Willows. The show was created by Rankin/Bass Productions in New York City, who produced 17 episodes. The show was a flop and canceled midway through its first season, airing from September 12 to December 26, 1970. ABC aired reruns of the show on Sunday mornings during the 1971–72 season. Copies of all 17 episodes were deposited at the Library of Congress, but only 10 episodes from other sources have been made publicly available as of 2024.

The half-hour comedy program included three shorts on each episode: the Reluctant Dragon took the first and third slots, with a Mr. Toad cartoon in the middle. Written by Romeo Muller and William J. Keenan, the series uses a team of Canadian voice actors with Bernard Cowan as the recording supervisor. Tobias, the Reluctant Dragon, was voiced by Paul Soles, while Mr. Toad was voiced by Claude Rae; other voices were done by Carl Banas and Donna Miller. The series' character designs were done by Paul Coker, and the animation supervision by Steve Nakagawa at Mushi Production in Tokyo.

== The Reluctant Dragon ==
Tobias is a gentle, dreamy dragon and Merlin the wizard placed a curse on him so that whenever he sees a daisy, he breathes fire. He is a kind-hearted soul who does not want to hurt the populace of Willowmarch Village, and is ashamed whenever he erupts in flame. He is regularly troubled by Daisy, a little blonde girl who wants to give him a bouquet of daisies, which make him breathe fire. Tobias is aided by a knight, Sir Malcolm St. George, who tries to protect both the village and the dragon. Willowmarch is ruled by King Herman, who hosts a variety show.

== Mr. Toad ==
Mr. Toad is a carefree gadabout playboy who likes driving fast cars and wearing expensive clothes. He is the wealthy owner of Toad Hall, and an object of ridicule among his friends — the timid Mole, intellectual Badger and outgoing Water Rat. Unlike Tobias, who lives in medieval Willowmarch, Mr. Toad lives in 19th century Scotland, but in the episode "Toad's Time Machine", Mr. Toad and friends travel back in time to medieval Willowmarch, and end up meeting Tobias, Daisy, and King Herman.

In 1986, Rankin/Bass produced a more faithful TV-film adaptation of The Wind in the Willows.

== Episode list ==
1. A Cold Day in Willowmarch / Build a Better Bungalow / A Day at the Fair
2. Cowardly Herman / Casey Toad / Daisies Away
3. Dippy / Gentlemen's Gentleman / Dragon Under Glass
4. Free a Cold, Starve a Viking / Ghost of Toad Hall / Happy Birthday, Dear Tobias
5. How to Be a Wizard / Jack of All Trades / How to Vex a Viking
6. If It's Wednesday It Must Be Vikingland / Jove! What a Day / Lights, Camera, Action
7. Merlin the Magician, Jr. / Micemaster Road / National Daisy Week
8. Never Count on a Cornflower / Movie Maker Toad / No Bix Like Show Bix
9. Saving the Crown / Polo Panic / Sir Tobias
10. Subway Sabotage / Sail Ho-Ho / Taxes Are a Drag on Dragons
11. The Big Break / Sandhogs / The Campscout Girls
12. The Flying Flagon / The Amphibious Mr. Toad / The Haunted Castle
13. The Kid's Last Fight / The Demolition Derby / The Purple Viking
14. The Robot Dragon / The Great Bonfire Contest / The Starve Versus Herman, the Attrocious
15. The Tobias Touch / The Great Motorcycle Race / Tobias the Terror of the Tournament
16. Tobias, the Reluctant Viking / Toad's Time Machine / Wretched Robin Hood
17. The Toughest Daisy in Willowmarch / Twenty Thousand Inches Under the Sea / The Great Zoo Bustout

== Voices ==
- Paul Soles: Tobias, Irving The Bold, Merlin The Magician Jr., Inkley, Mole, Badger, Chief Weasel, King the Lion, Robin Hood, Sir Lancelot, Additional voices
- Carl Banas: King Herman The Atrocious, Ugly Olaf, Sheriff of Nottingham, Sir Gallahad, Uncle Charles, Monk the Gorilla, Sir Andrew Agincourt, Additional voices
- Donna Miller: Daisy, Water Rat, Queen of England, Field Mice, Additional voices
- Claude Rae: Mr. Toad, Sir Malcolm St. George, Bunkley, King Arthur, Sir Mack, Additional voices
