= Peter Forster =

Peter Forster may refer to:

- Peter Forster (actor) (1920–1982), English actor
- Peter Forster (wood engraver) (1934–2021), English wood engraver, artist and printmaker
- Peter Forster (bishop) (born 1950), British Anglican bishop
- Peter Forster (geneticist) (born 1967), German-British geneticist

== See also ==
- Peter Foster (disambiguation)
