= Peter Sabine =

English cricketer

Personal information
- Full name: Peter Noel Barrington Sabine
- Born: 21 September 1941 (age 85); Cookham Dean, Berkshire, England
- Batting: Right-handed
- Bowling: Right-arm leg-spin

Domestic team information
- Years: Team
- 1962–1963: Oxford University

Career statistics
Competition	First-class
Matches	12
Runs scored	420
Batting average	21.00
100s/50s	0/3
Top score	56
Balls bowled	1236
Wickets	15
Bowling average	36.86
5 wickets in innings	0
10 wickets in match	0
Best bowling	4/51
Catches/stumpings	10/–
- Source: Cricinfo, 28 August 2017

Peter Noel Barrington Sabine (born 21 September 1941) is a former cricketer who played first-class cricket for Oxford University in 1962 and 1963.

Born in Cookham Dean, Berkshire, Peter Sabine attended Marlborough College, where he captained the First XI and played at Lord's for Southern Schools and Combined Schools in 1960. Writing in Wisden, E. M. Wellings described him as a commendable stroke-maker who played "positive, aggressive cricket". He went up to Hertford College, Oxford, and played two matches for Oxford University in 1962 and 10 in 1963, when he was awarded his blue.

His highest score in first-class cricket was 56 against Surrey in 1963. His best bowling return with his leg-spin was 4 for 51 against Marylebone Cricket Club (MCC), also in 1963. Earlier in the season he had helped Oxford achieve their first first-class victory for two years when he made 50 not out and 42 and took 3 for 18 in the second innings against Nottinghamshire.
