= Folio Society =

British publisher founded in 1947

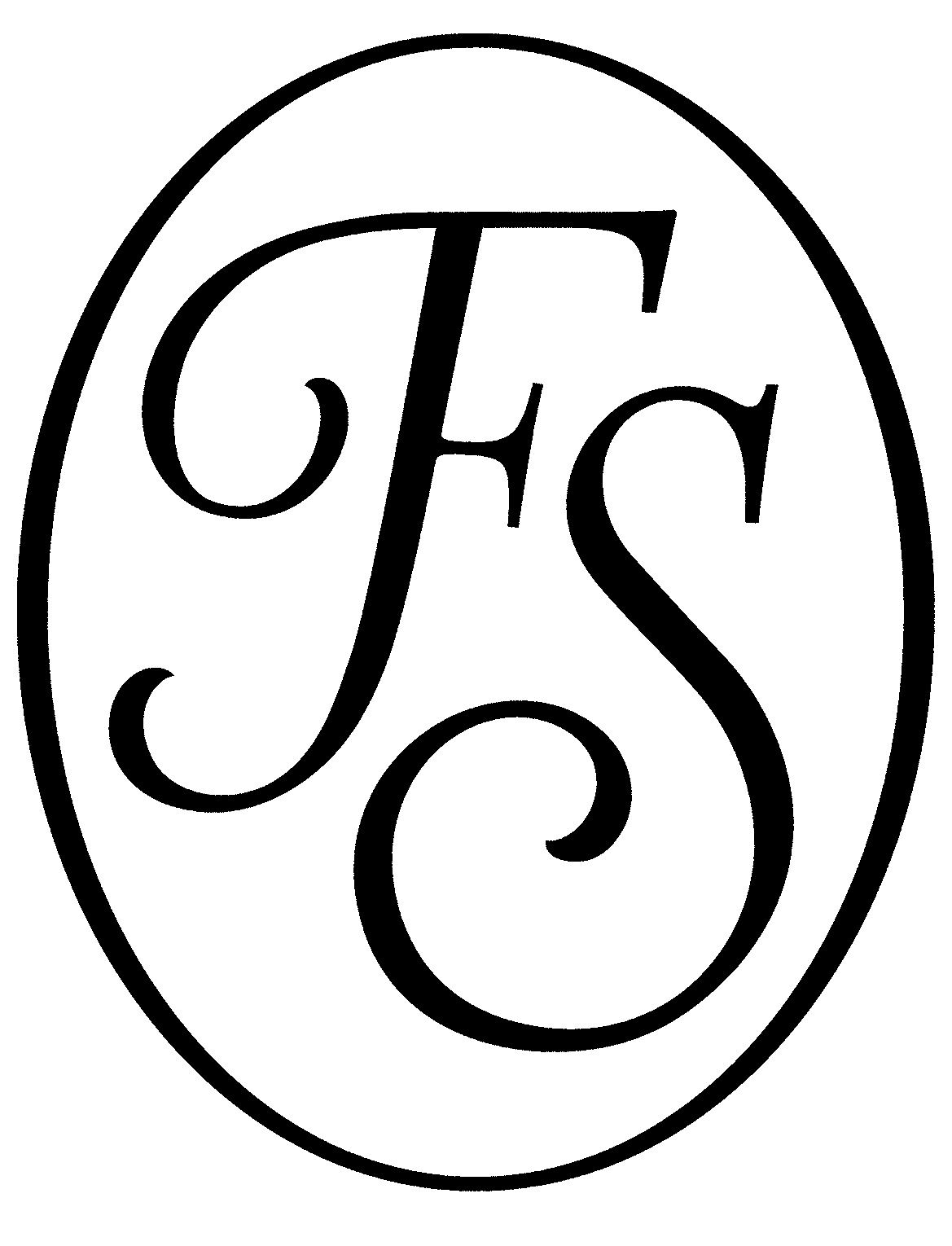
- Founded: 1947; 79 years ago
- Founder: Charles Ede
- Country of origin: United Kingdom
- Headquarters location: 4 Maguire Street, London
- Distribution: Worldwide
- Key people: Lord Gavron
- Publication types: Books, Limited Editions
- Official website: foliosociety.com

The Folio Society is an independent London-based publisher, founded by Charles Ede in 1947 and incorporated in 1971. Formerly privately owned, it became an employee ownership trust in 2021.

It produces illustrated hardback fine press editions of fiction and non-fiction books, poetry and children's titles. Folio editions feature specially designed bindings and include artist-commissioned illustrations (most often in fiction titles) or researched artworks and photographs (in non-fiction titles). The Folio Society publishes titles across a breadth of genres including fantasy, science fiction, modern fiction and non-fiction from authors such as George R. R. Martin, Madeline Miller and Stephen King.

Folio Society editions have won prestigious awards, including the V&A Book Illustration Awards, the British Book Production and Design Awards and the Association of Illustrators World Illustration Awards.

== History ==
The Folio Society was founded in 1947 by Charles Ede, Christopher Sandford (of Golden Cockerel Press), and Alan Bott (founder of Pan Books). Folio and the Golden Cockerel Press shared premises in Poland Street until 1955. The Folio Society moved to its location in 44 Eagle Street, Holborn, in 1994 – in 2017, their offices moved to 4 Maguire Street, London.

At its inception, The Folio Society operated as a membership-based book club; as the list of titles grew, the membership commitment was established as four books per year. Since 2011, anyone has been able to purchase from the Folio Society list without committing to membership. On 1 September 2016, the company ended its membership-based structure and Folio editions are now available to purchase online.

In 1971, The Folio Society was incorporated and purchased by John Letts and Halfdan Lynner. Under their ownership, The Folio Society published the collected novels of Dickens, Trollope, Hardy, Elizabeth Gaskell and Conrad.

Lord Gavron was owner and chairman of The Folio Society from 1982 until his death in 2015. Lady Gavron took over as chair until 2021, when Folio became an Employee Ownership Trust.

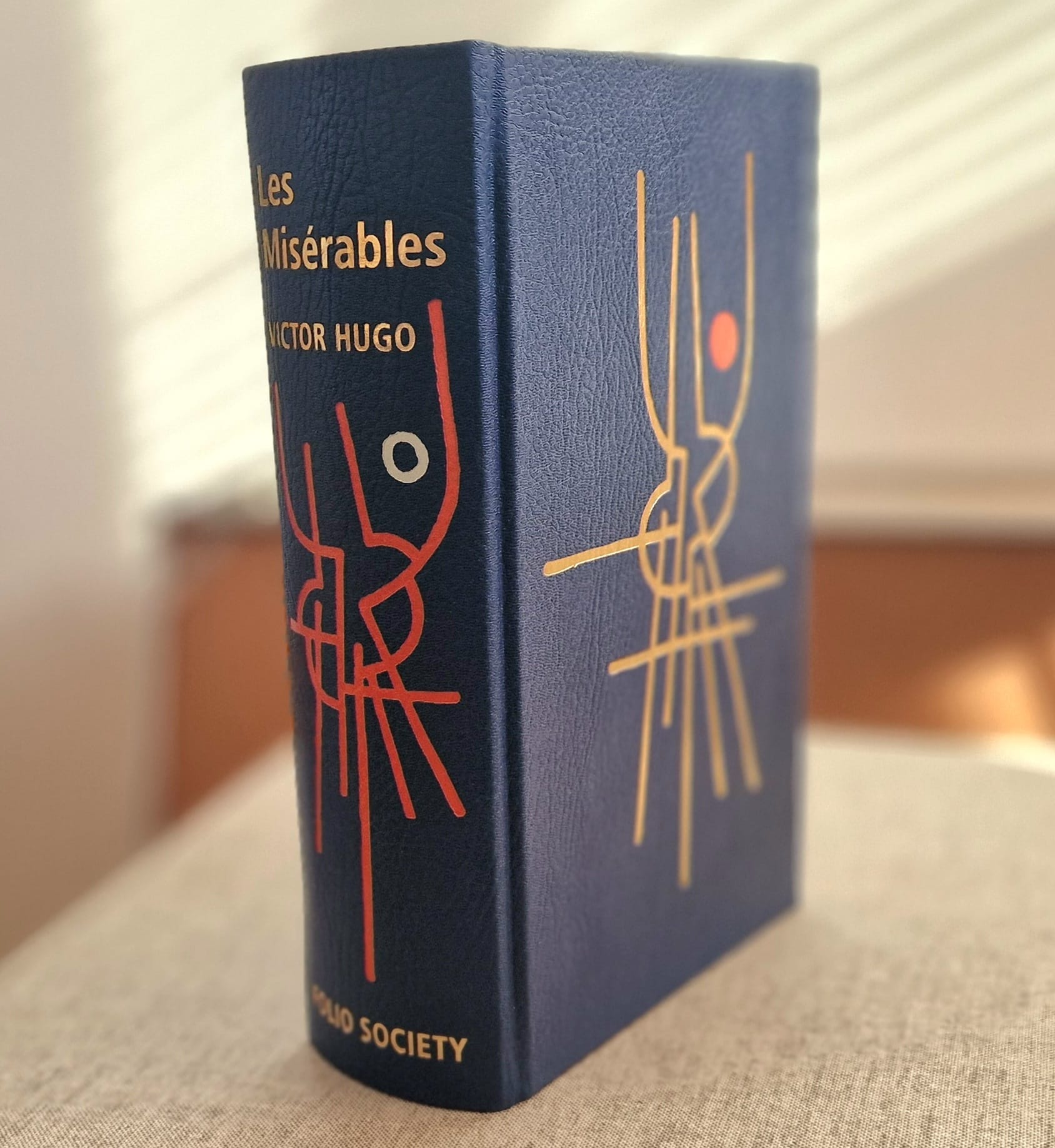
The Folio Society's 2008 limited edition of Les Misérables, by Victor Hugo, designed by Jeff Clements

== Publishing trends ==
The company currently publishes around 50 titles a year, including a number of limited editions. Limited editions are hand-numbered and sometimes contain additional elements such as prints or stickers, as well as signatures from authors, introducers and illustrators. Recent limited editions include George Orwell's Nineteen Eighty-Four and Neuromancer by William Gibson.

In recent years, Folio has evolved, particularly under the stewardship of Joanna Reynolds, embracing new genres, fandoms and diverse modern authors, as well as new partnerships with major brands like Marvel and DC.

== Production and craft ==
Folio is known to produce high-quality books with a focus on craftsmanship and sustainability. Each edition is designed "to be treasured forever", printed on acid-free paper with high-quality materials that will stand the test of time.

Many editions include traditional bookmaking and printing techniques, and they work closely with artisan suppliers, including Ludlow Bookbinders in Shropshire, Smith Settle in Yorkshire and specialist letterpress printer Phil Abel in London. Other books are crafted using the cutting-edge technologies of printers such as L.E.G.O. in Italy.

== Community ==
The Folio Society has a fanbase, attracting fans and collectors internationally. There are fan communities online with thousands of members who collect Folio Society books and share their collections online.

== Artists and illustration ==
Each of Folio's editions contain illustrations, art or photography and the company have been working to champion new and emerging artists. Since 2022, they have hosted an annual Folio Book Illustration Award with the aim of finding, platforming and supporting new illustration talent from around the world. Winners receive a cash prize and the chance for their illustrations to be featured in upcoming Folio editions.

Designers of bindings have included David Eccles, Jeff Clements, Neil Gower, Neil Packer and John Westwood. Neil Gower has been credited with more than 100 binding designs for the Folio Society.

=== Illustrators ===
Notable among the hundreds of illustrators of Folio books are:

- Edward Ardizzone (R L Stevenson, Travels with a Donkey)
- Quentin Blake (Voltaire, Candide; George Orwell, Animal Farm)
- Harry Brockway (S T Coleridge, The Rime of the Ancient Mariner)
- John Lawrence (Laurence Sterne, Tristram Shandy; T H White, The Once and Future King)
- Beryl Cook (Christopher Isherwood, Mr Norris Changes Trains; Muriel Spark, The Prime of Miss Jean Brodie)
- Anthony Colbert (Jane Eyre)
- Geoff Grandfield (novels and stories of Raymond Chandler)
- Sam Weber (William Golding, Lord of the Flies; Gene Wolfe, The Book of the New Sun; Frank Herbert, Dune)
- Margrethe II of Denmark (as Ingahild Grathmer) (J.R.R. Tolkien, The Lord of the Rings)
- Dave McKean (Gormenghast; Roadside Picnic)
- Elisabeth Frink (Horace Odes)
- Charles Keeping (complete novels of Charles Dickens)
- Francis Mosley (complete Joseph Conrad)
- Charles van Sandwyk (Kenneth Grahame, The Wind in the Willows; Lewis Carroll, Alice in Wonderland)
- Neil Packer (Umberto Eco, The Name of the Rose; Joseph Heller, Catch-22; Complete Works of William Shakespeare)
- Tom Phillips (Samuel Beckett, Waiting for Godot; T. S. Eliot, The Waste Land)
- Peter Forster (Canterbury Tales by Chaucer, novels of George Eliot, plays and sonnets of Shakespeare and selected works by Oscar Wilde)
- Peter Reddick (complete novels and stories of Thomas Hardy)
- Paula Rego (English nursery rhymes compilation and J M Barrie, Peter Pan and Wendy)

Some recent commissions are from:

- A. Richard Allen (Kingsley Amis, Lucky Jim)
- Elena and Anna Balbusso (Pushkin, Eugene Onegin)
- James Boswell (J G Ballard, The Drowned World; Margery Allingham, Traitor's Purse)
- Jonathan Burton (Douglas Adams, The Hitchhiker's Guide to the Galaxy; George Orwell, Nineteen Eighty-Four)
- Jamie Clarke (Diarmaid MacCulloch, A History of Christianity: The First Three Thousand Years)
- Fay Dalton (Ian Fleming, Casino Royale, From Russia, with Love)
- Jeff Fisher (Lewis Carroll, The Hunting of the Snark)
- Stephen Hickman (Robert Heinlein, Starship Troopers)
- David Hughes (Ken Kesey, One Flew Over the Cuckoo's Nest; Mark Twain, A Connecticut Yankee in King Arthur's Court)
- Federico Infante (Vladimir Nabokov, Lolita)
- Igor Karash (Leo Tolstoy, War and Peace; Angela Carter, The Bloody Chamber and Other Stories)
- John Vernon Lord (James Joyce, Finnegans Wake)
- Shotopop (Philip K Dick, The Man in the High Castle)
- Jillian Tamaki (Christina Rossetti, Goblin Market)
- Joe Wilson (Arthur C Clarke, 2001: A Space Odyssey)

== See also ==
- Easton Press
- Franklin Library
- A History of England
- Golden Cockerel Press

== Sources ==
- Cave, Roderick & Sarah Mason, A History of the Golden Cockerel Press, 1920–1960 (2002. British Library & Oak Knoll Press)
- Nash, Paul W., Folio 50: a bibliography of the Folio Society, 1947–1996 (1997. Folio Press in association with The British Library)
- Nash, Paul W. Folio 60: a bibliography of the Folio Society, 1947–2006 (2007. Folio Society) (Includes essays by Sue Bradbury, Joseph Connolly and David McKitterick)
- Nash, Paul W., 'Folio fine editions', in Parenthesis (4 April 2000), pp. 22–24. (Includes a checklist of 'Fine editions', giving print-runs)
