= The Wind in the Willows (1987 film) =

1987 animated television film by Arthur Rankin, Jr. and Jules Bass

- Based on: The Wind in the Willows by Kenneth Grahame
- Screenplay by: Romeo Muller
- Directed by: Arthur Rankin, Jr.; Jules Bass
- Voices of: Charles Nelson Reilly; Roddy McDowall; José Ferrer; Eddie Bracken; Paul Frees; Robert McFadden; Ray Owens; Gerry Matthews; Ron Marshall; Alice Tweedie; Jeryl Jagoda
- Composers: Maury Laws; Lyrics: Jules Bass
- Countries of origin: United States; Taiwan
- Original language: English

Production
- Producers: Arthur Rankin, Jr.; Jules Bass
- Cinematography: James C.Y. Wang
- Running time: 96 minutes
- Production companies: Rankin/Bass Animated Entertainment; Animation: Cuckoo's Nest Studios

Original release
- Network: ABC
- Release: July 5, 1987

The Wind in the Willows is a 1987 American animated musical television film directed by Arthur Rankin, Jr. and Jules Bass, co-founders of Rankin/Bass Productions in New York, New York. It is an adaptation of Kenneth Grahame's 1908 novel The Wind in the Willows. Set in a pastoral version of England, the film focuses on four anthropomorphised animal characters (Moley, Ratty, Mr. Toad, and Mr. Badger) and contains themes of mysticism, adventure, morality, and camaraderie. The film features the voices of Charles Nelson Reilly, Roddy McDowall, José Ferrer, and Eddie Bracken. The screenplay was written by Romeo Muller, a long-time Rankin/Bass writer whose work included Rudolph the Red-Nosed Reindeer (1964), Frosty the Snowman (1969), The Hobbit (1977), and The Flight of Dragons (1982), among others. The film's animation was outsourced to James C.Y. Wang's Cuckoo's Nest Studios (also known as Wang Film Productions) in Taipei, Taiwan.

This was the last project produced by Rankin/Bass before the company was shut down on March 4, 1987. The film was finished in 1983 and released on video in the UK in November of that year, but its American television premiere was delayed several times trying to air in 1985, before finally airing July 5, 1987 on ABC. In this version, the horse pulling the barge is the same horse who pulls Mr. Toad's caravan, Portly is Badger's nephew, and The Piper at the Gates of Dawn and Wayfarer's All chapters are included, although the events of Wayfarer's All occurs before the events of The Piper at the Gates of Dawn, and Ratty actually leaves the Riverbank, only to be found later by Mole (alongside Portly).

Rankin/Bass had previously produced a television show with the Wind in the Willows characters in 1970, The Reluctant Dragon & Mr. Toad Show, with the voices of Canadian actors Paul Soles, Donna Miller, Claude Rae and Carl Banas, the production artwork of Paul Coker, Jr., and the animation of Osamu Tezuka's Mushi Production in Tokyo, Japan.

== Plot ==
The "well-known and ever popular" Mr. Toad of Toad Hall (voice of Charles Nelson Reilly), a conceited and impulsive animal, embarks on a madcap river voyage in a paddleboat, nearly shipwrecking his friend Ratty (voiced by Roddy McDowall) who is out for a leisurely row. At the same time, Toad whelms the entrance to the subterranean home of Moley (voice of Eddie Bracken). So disturbed, Moley comes above ground for the first time in his life, and is positively amazed by the surface world. At once he meets Ratty, who invites him to come along on his river cruise ("Wind in the Willows"). All too soon, Toad returns and recklessly overturns Ratty's boat, nearly drowning Moley, but Ratty saves him and pushes him along to shore.

Ratty, not taking kindly to interference of nature, resolves to have it out with Toad, and he and Moley paddle down the river together ("Messing Around in Boats"). On their way downriver to Toad Hall, they pass Badger (voice of José Ferrer), who is tending his land on the riverbank. Despite their friendly greetings, Badger gruffly reminds them that he is not the most social of animals and retreats. At Toad Hall, Ratty and Moley find that Toad (true to his form) has tired of boating and instead developed an appetite for overnight wagoneering. Not one to take no for an answer, Toad invites them to come along on his first trip, but Moley and Ratty find that he has planned the journey with complete disregard to packing food and drink ("We Don't Have Any Paté de Foie Gras"). Toad shrugs off the criticism. The next day, their wagon is almost wrecked by a passing motorcar while the horse runs away and gets lost, inspiring Toad to forget wagoneering and turn his undivided attention to motoring, and as Moley and Ratty take a train, Toad boards a separate one. Within days of buying his first car ("Messing Around in Cars"), his reckless driving demolishes it ("Mr. Toad").

Nearing winter, Moley wishes to visit Badger in spite of Ratty's remonstrations. While Ratty dozes, Moley slips out to brave the Wild Wood and attempt to call on Badger. But as he walks through the Wild Wood, his imagination gets the better of him; perceiving evil faces in the trees all around him, he is frightened into hiding. Ratty eventually finds him, but heading for home, they lose their way in falling snow. By pure chance they happen upon Badger's front door, and although Badger is at first annoyed by their call ("I Hate Company"), he gets a change of heart and welcomes them in when he recognizes them as friends.

Badger hears of Toad's automotive antics (crashing through a window and upsetting a banquet table, crashing into a moving train, destroying a barn, a wheel's coming loose on a makeshift car, driving up an apple tree, and careening off a drawbridge and into the river) from Ratty and Moley and resolves to do something about it come spring. When Toad still refuses to listen to reason after a quite intense confrontation with an accompanying thunderstorm, Badger orders him locked in his bedroom until he comes to his senses. Nonetheless, Toad still longs for the open road ("Messing Around in Cars Reprise"), and tricks Ratty into leaving him alone in the house. He secretly escapes his exile, makes his way to a nearby village and promptly makes off with another motorcar, which he just as promptly wrecks while insulting the pedestrians and oncoming traffics who get out of the way just in time until Toad is taken to court and sentenced to 20 years in prison ("Guilty!") for his offenses.

Fortunately for Toad, the warden's daughter takes pity on him and helps him escape in the guise of a washerwoman. At first hitching a ride on a train with another one at the platform, Toad finds the police in hot pursuit on another one, but is aided in his getaway by the train driver, who takes pity on Toad after seeing him in tears. His next reprieve comes from a barge woman, but when he bungles a load of laundry, he rudely reveals himself to the barge woman and finds himself back on the road with his old caravan horse. There he encounters the very same motorcar whose theft landed him in prison; but in his disguise he fools the owners into letting him drive it again. Lesson still not learned, he loses control of the car and barely survives.

In the meantime, Ratty, unaware of Toad's escape, writes him a letter detailing the takeover of Toad Hall by Wild Wood animals, principally weasels, stoats, and ferrets. While describing the ruin wrought on Toad Hall ("A Party That Never Ceases"), Ratty hears the news about Toad from Badger. Not long thereafter, an old wayfarer visits Ratty and tells him all about the world beyond the riverbank. Overcome with wanderlust, Ratty follows him, but aborts his adventure when he finds Badger's young nephew Portly lost in the woods. Moley finds them at the same time as Badger finds Toad washed up on the riverbank, ostensibly with the help of a mystical wood-spirit called Pan.

As part of the scheme to retake Toad Hall, Moley calls upon the stoats guarding the gate, using Toad's washerwoman disguise. He vastly exaggerates the battle plan, fooling the stoats into thinking that overwhelming forces are advancing on Toad Hall. That night, Badger, Ratty, Moley and Toad sneak into Toad Hall via an old secret tunnel. Aided by the fear of Moley's warning, they deceive the weasels into surrendering and successfully reclaim Toad Hall. In private, Toad prepares a rousing speech despite the friends dissuading him from doing so ("Mr. Toad Reprise"). That night, the forest animals have a banquet at Toad Hall celebrating their liberation from the weasels, but Toad does not do anything to brag. Later, when sitting by a fireplace before Badger, Moley, and Ratty, Toad declares his plans to make restitution to all he wronged as well as adopt a new credo of friendship and charity, assuring his friends he has indeed repented. During the ending credits, Toad, Rat, Mole and Badger are seen befriending the weasels, stoats and ferrets who, in turn, have repented of their old ways.

== Cast ==
- Charles Nelson Reilly as Mr. Toad
- Roddy McDowall as Ratty
- José Ferrer as Mr. Badger
- Eddie Bracken as Moley
- Paul Frees as Wayfarer
- Robert McFadden as Magistrate
- Ray Owens as Clerk of the Court
- Gerry Matthews as Jailer
- Alice Tweedie as Washerwoman
- Jeryl Jagoda as Additional voices
- Ron Marshall as Additional voices

== Music ==
No.	Title	Performer(s)	Length
1.	"Wind in the Willows"	Judy Collins
2.	"Messing Around in Boats"	Roddy McDowall
3.	"We Don't Have Any Pate de Foie Gras"	Roddy McDowall & Eddie Bracken
4.	"Messing Around in Cars"	Charles Nelson Reilly
5.	"Mr. Toad"	Charles Nelson Reilly
6.	"I Hate Company"	José Ferrer, Roddy McDowall & Eddie Bracken
7.	"Guilty!"	Robert McFadden & Chorus
8.	"A Party That Never Ceases"	Chorus
9.	"Mr. Toad (Reprise)"	Charles Nelson Reilly & Chorus
