= Jonathon Coudrille =

English artist, musician and writer

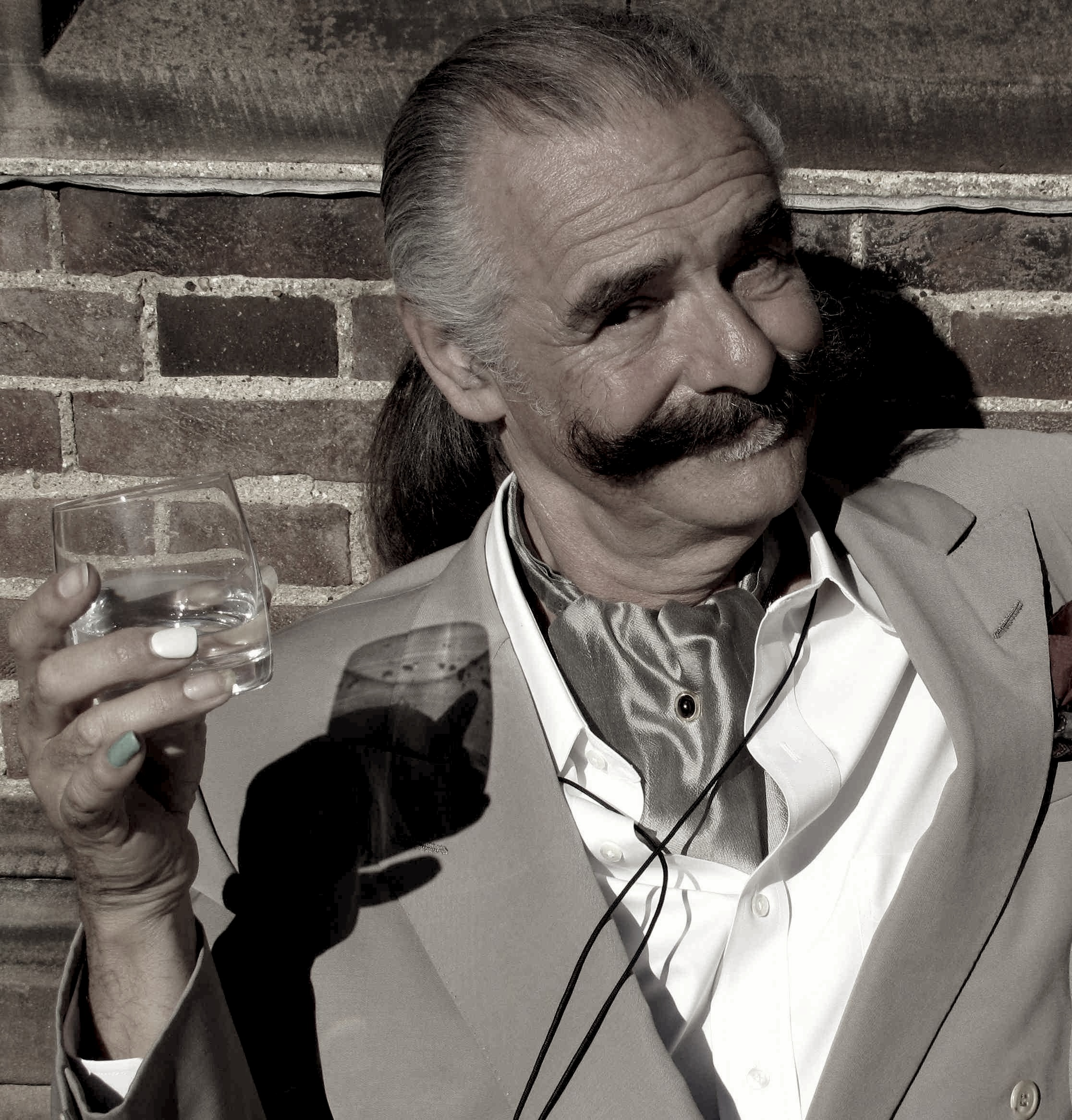
- Coudrille in 2009
- Born: November 1945 (age 80); Birmingham, England
- Education: Penzance School of Art
- Occupations: Broadcaster, musician, artist, writer
- Parent: Francis Coudrill (father)

Jonathon Xavier Coudrille (born Jonathan Coudrill; November 1945) is an English artist, musician and writer. He has lived from a young age on the Lizard Peninsula in Cornwall, an area with which he is still closely associated. His father was the artist and ventriloquist Francis Coudrill (1913–1989). In 2011 he founded the Lizard Stuckists.

== Career ==
With notable contributions in a number of fields, Coudrille can be described as a polymath.

=== Broadcasting ===
After attending the Royal Grammar School, High Wycombe from 1957 to 1961, Coudrille started out in broadcasting at the age of 17, appearing as a political satirist on both BBC Plymouth and the local commercial station Westward Television, which gave him his own show entitled Young Tomorrow. He also worked on BBC Radio's Today programme, under the aegis of Jack de Manio. He continued with musical political satire when he moved from the BBC to Southern Television, where he was given a Monday news magazine slot, and was later the station's musical director for a period. However, his career in broadcasting was abruptly cut short by a car accident in 1972, which temporarily crippled him with spinal damage.

=== Art ===
Coudrille studied painting with the leading English surrealist John Tunnard at the Penzance School of Art, where Tunnard taught from 1945 to 1965.

In 1971 he provided the artwork for the self-titled debut album by rock band Fuzzy Duck.

He illustrated A Fresh Wind in the Willows by Dixon Scott, a sequel to Kenneth Grahame's The Wind in the Willows published in 1983 by Heinemann in the UK, published in 1987 by Dell Yearling in the United States.

During the 1990s, Coudrille exhibited at the Royal Academy in London and the South West Academy of Fine and Applied Arts in Exeter. In 2004, during the Liverpool Biennial, his work was included in The Stuckists Punk Victorian show at the Walker Art Gallery.

Some of his recent work, most notably the photographic montage Analogue of Surreal Nostalgia (2005), is in the permanent collection of Falmouth Art Gallery.

Coudrille was interviewed about his life and paintings for the programme John Nettles' Westcountry, broadcast by the Artsworld channel, now known as Sky Arts.

=== Music ===
Coudrille is also a multi-instrumentalist; he plays and composes for guitar, seven-string banjo, piano, organ and trumpet. His musical interests and influences are principally jazz, Russian and gypsy music.

During the 1960s, Coudrille played in Soho strip-clubs. During his broadcasting career, he composed and arranged for television and radio; his guitar performance and arrangement of Francisco Tárrega's Recuerdos de la Alhambra was the signature tune for Jack Hargreaves' long-running Out of Town. He entered the Melody Maker's national folk contest in 1974, and was named top rock-folk soloist. Later, at the peak of his musical career during the 1980s, he performed his composition Caballeta Suite for Spanish guitar in concert with the National Symphony Orchestra at the Royal Festival Hall in London.

He is currently a member of the Cornish semi-acoustic jazz band, Gwelhellin Goth, and the Russian folk music duo, Muzika Muzikantov.

=== Writing ===
Coudrille took up the writing and illustration of children's books as a form of occupational therapy, while recovering from spinal damage. This unexpected turn of events led to him becoming an award-winning author and illustrator.

The illustrated alphabet A Beastly Collection was published in 1974 by Frederick Warne & Co, the publishers of Beatrix Potter. The book received critical acclaim, and was compared to the work of John Tenniel.

His second book Farmer Fisher (1975) was a best seller, winning the UK Children's Book of The Year award in 1976. Farmer Fisher is thought to have been the first picture book on the UK market to include a record (7-inch vinyl disc). It was republished in 1978 by Puffin Books, and in 2010 by Footsteps Press.
