= The Mount, Cookham Dean =

Country house in Berkshire, England

The Mount
- Interactive map of the The Mount area

General information
- Type: Country house, originally a hunting lodge
- Location: Spring Lane, Cookham Dean, Berkshire, England
- Coordinates: 51°33′02″N 0°44′46″W

Design and construction
- Designations: Grade II listed

The Mount is a country house in Cookham Dean, Berkshire, England. It was originally built as a hunting lodge in the 16th century and subsequently extended in the late 19th century so that it now has three floors, four reception rooms, twelve bedrooms and four bathrooms. It is on a plot of 3.5 acres (1.4 ha) on high ground overlooking the Thames river.

It was listed for protection as Grade II on 21 September 1987.

The author Kenneth Grahame lived there for two years as a child after his mother died when he was five. The house belonged to his maternal grandmother, Mary Inglis, and he lived there with her and his uncle, David, who was the curate of the parish church. The locality was influential in the creation of his writing such as The Wind in the Willows.

Other notable people associated with the house include Sir Stanley Spencer, who painted a picture of it.
