= Dixon Scott =

English journalist and novelist

Dixon Cowie Scott (c. August 1925 - October 2002 (age 77)) was an English journalist and novelist from South Shields, Tyne and Wear. His first novel, Jolly Jack Tart, appeared in 1974, inspired by his time in the Royal Navy and the Minesweepers.

In 1983, Heinemann published his sequel to Kenneth Grahame's 1908 novel, The Wind in the Willows, A Fresh Wind in the Willows, with illustrations by Jonathon Coudrille, which was published in the United States by Dell Yearling in 1987. By this point, he was living in Suffolk, England.

He worked for News of the World for 16 years.
