= Phillimore Place =

Street in Kensington, London

Coordinates: 51.50159°N 0.19771°W

Phillimore Place is a street in Kensington, London.

Phillimore Place runs from its junction with Phillimore Gardens in the south-west to Argyll Road in the north-east.

Phillimore Place formed part of the Phillimore estate, inherited by William Phillimore in 1779. The late Georgian houses were built from 1788 to 1816, largely designed by William Porden.

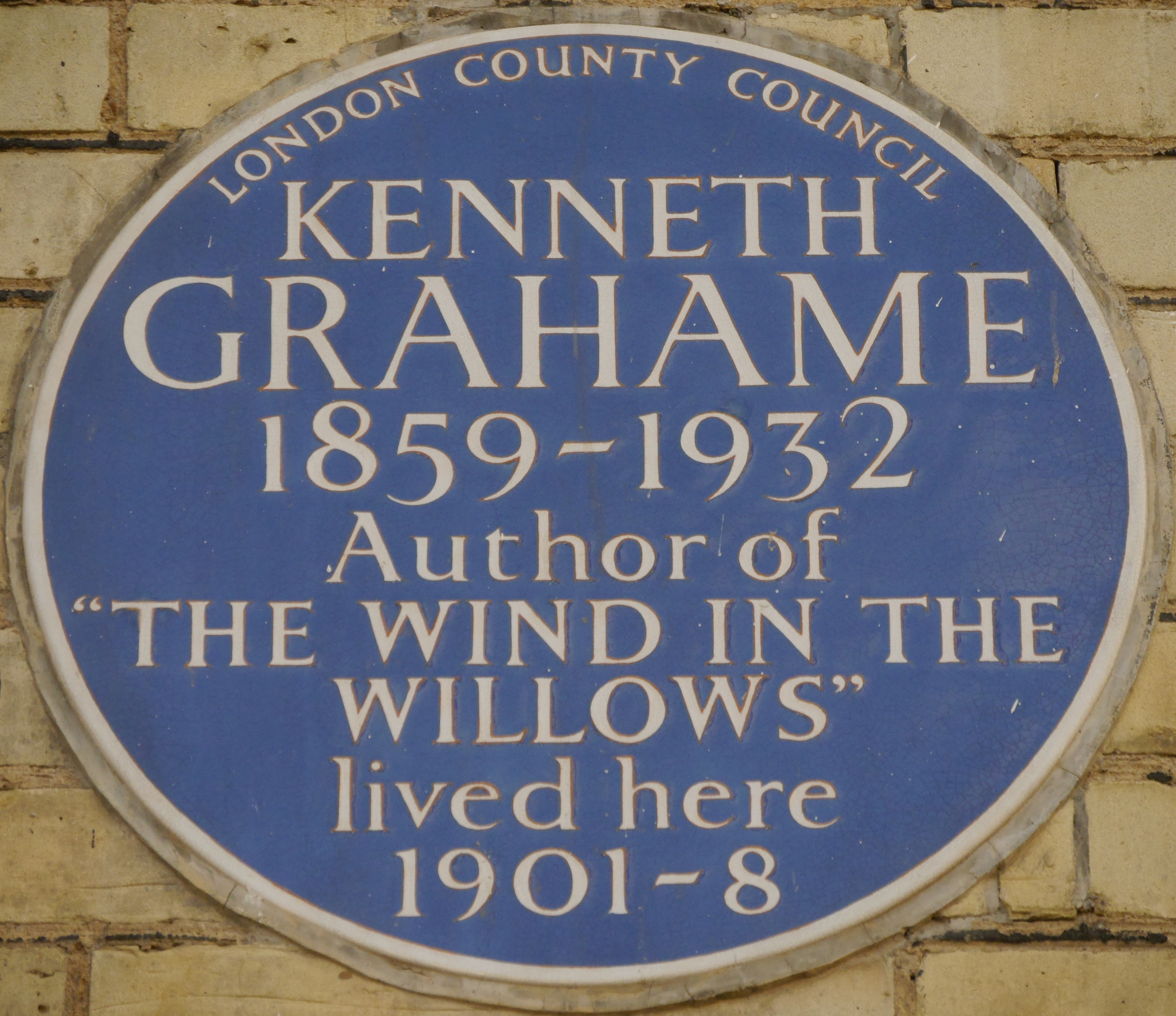
Blue plaque, 16 Phillimore Place, London, home to Kenneth Grahame, 1901–1908

The author Kenneth Grahame lived at no.16 from 1901 to 1908, and there is a blue plaque there in his honour.

In 1955, Bernard Williams, Shirley Williams, Helge Rubinstein and Hilary Rubinstein, bought a four-storey, seven-bedroom house in the street for £6,800, and lived there together for 14 years.
