= Mr. Toad =

- The Wind in the Willows character
- Illustration by E.H. Shepard
- First appearance: The Wind in the Willows
- Created by: Kenneth Grahame
- Portrayed by: Peter Harryson (stage adaptation)
- Voiced by: Eric Blore (1949 film); David Jason (1983 film, 1984 TV series); Charles Nelson Reilly (1987 film); Rik Mayall (1995 film, 1996 sequel)

In-universe information
- Species: Toad
- Gender: Male
- Occupation: The Squire of Toad Hall
- Nationality: English

Mr. Toad, of Toad Hall, is one of the main characters in the 1908 novel The Wind in the Willows by Kenneth Grahame.

== Inspiration ==
The inspiration for Mr. Toad's wayward mischievousness and boastfulness was Kenneth Grahame's only child Alastair: a family friend, Constance Smedley, overheard Grahame telling Alastair the exploits of Toad as a bedtime story, and noted that "Alastair's own tendency to exult in his exploits was gently satirized in Mr. Toad". Colonel Francis Cecil Ricardo (1852–1924), the first owner of a car in Cookham in Berkshire, where Grahame wrote the books is also thought to have been an influence. Other suggestions include Walter Cunliffe, 1st Baron Cunliffe and Sir Charles Day Rose.

== Character ==
Toad is the squire of the English countryside estate Toad Hall, which he inherited from his family. Toad is a jovial and friendly figure but he is often ruled by his conceit and impulsiveness which frequently gets him into trouble. Toad is known for becoming obsessed with various activities and then eventually growing bored with them. In the novel Toad becomes obsessed with motor cars after one runs him and his friends off the road in his caravan. Toad is a passionate driver and crashes at least eight motor cars before his friends step in and encourage him to change his ways.

== In other works ==
A. A. Milne's 1929 play Toad of Toad Hall was based on the book. William Horwood wrote several children's novels, Tales of the Willows, continuing the original story.

The 2013 graphic adventure video game The Wolf Among Us, based on the Fables comic book series, features Mr. Toad as "a foul-mouthed taxi-driver" voiced by Chuck Kourouklis.

== Portrayals ==
- Eric Blore – The Adventures of Ichabod and Mr. Toad (1949 film)
- David Jason – The Wind in the Willows (1983 film)
- Charles Nelson Reilly – The Wind in the Willows (1987 film)
- Rik Mayall – The Wind in the Willows (1995 film). He won an Emmy Award for the role.
- Terry Jones – The Wind in the Willows (1996 film)
- Matt Lucas – The Wind in the Willows (2006 film)
- Peter Harryson – on stage.
- Nathan Lane – The Wind in the Willows (1985 stage musical)
- Rufus Hound – The Wind in the Willows (musical)
