= Whirligig (TV series) =

British TV programme for children

Whirligig's title card

Whirligig is a BBC television programme for children originally broadcast fortnightly from November 1950 until June 1954, with summer breaks, and then subsequently revived for a single further series from October 1955 to June 1956. It was the first Saturday children's programme to be broadcast live from the BBC's Lime Grove Studios, at 5:00 pm on alternate Saturdays.

== Premise ==
The show was conceived by producer Michael Westmore as the first children's magazine programme, with linking scenes presented by Humphrey Lestocq, who was the stooge of the obnoxious puppet Mr. Turnip, voiced by Peter Hawkins. Lestocq's catchphrase was "Goody, Goody Gumdrops" and Mr. Turnip's was "Lawky, Lawky, Lum".

== Shows featured ==
The series took the form of individual shows:

- Box of Tricks: a magic show hosted by Geoffrey Robinson. (1950-1953, 1955-1956)
- Hank the Cowboy - a cutout animated series, written, drawn, composed and voiced by Francis Coudrill. (1950–1954)
- Mr. Lumber’s Shop - a series starring John Le Mesurier and Marcel Stellman. (1951)
- In Search of the Shadow - a serial in six parts. (1951)
- Stranger from Space - Britain's first ever science fiction serial, which starred Brian Smith as Ian Spencer and Michael Newell as his alien friend Bilaphodorus, who had crashed on Earth. 16 episodes were produced. (1951–1952)
- Big Top - a series starring Reginald Dyson as Charlie Carter, Clive Dunn as Sammy Smith, Phillip Coral as Bobbin and John Gabriel as Alf Harper. 7 episodes were produced. (1952)
- The Steve Race Corner - hosted by Steve Race, pianist for the show. Later renamed Room For Music. (1952–1955)
- The Highwayman’s Bargain - a serial in six parts starring John Franklyn as Dick Turpin. (1953)
- Secrets of the Centuries - a serial in five parts starring Alan Judd. (1953)
- Sooty - presented by Harry Corbett. (1953–1954)
- Colonel Crock - written by Annette Mills, which moved to Associated-Rediffusion in 1959. (1953)
- Jeremy Make-Believe - a series starring Colin Gibson as Jeremy and Peter Hawkins as Albert. (1955)
- Willoughby - presented by Rolf Harris, Willoughby was a drawing board that came to life. (1955–1956)
- Can We Help You? - a series starring Peter Hawkins, with James Ottaway as Clibber and Raymond Rollett as Sly. (1956)

In total, 91 episodes were aired. The only known surviving recording of the programme is a 3 minute audio recording of a 1954 episode.
