= Francis Coudrill =

English artist and ventriloquist

Francis Coudrill and Hank the Cowboy

Francis Coudrill (1913 in Warwick – 1989) was an English artist and ventriloquist, most notable for being the creator of Hank the Cowboy. He was also an artist and illustrator.

Coudrill appeared on the 1950s BBC children's television show Whirligig, broadcast live from Lime Grove Studios.

His son is the artist Jonathon Coudrille.

Professor Sir Christopher Frayling, Rector and Vice Provost of the Royal College of Art and Chairman of the Arts Council said about him:

Francis Coudrill introduced the first generation of post-war baby-boomers – the lucky ones who watched television at home in the early 1950s – to TV animation and to the European Western, both at the same time. Hank Rides Again involved puppetry (for the studio introductions to each episode), drawings, cut-out animations, several distinct voices (including that of the horse Silver King, who was something like Disney’s Goofy) and sound effects – all supplied by Francis Coudrill, who made a personal appearance in a check shirt each week with Hank as his ventriloquist’s dummy. The end of each episode, a back view of Hank riding off into the sunset and descending below the horizon line, is still etched in my memory. My interest in European Westerns was first kindled by Hank Rides Again. So was my interest in artisanal kitchen-table animation – an aesthetic challenge to the cartoons produced by the big American studios. Okay, some of the characters were 1950s stereotypes – Mexican Pete the bad bandit, Dirty Face the Indian Chief – but they were harmless and good-hearted ones. They certainly didn’t do me any lasting damage. Francis Coudrill lives on, for all those of us who are about to be eligible for our bus passes and who remember sitting in cramped front rooms dreaming of wide open spaces and listening to tall stories which grew taller in the telling.

== The Mermaid Studio ==
Coudrill's artistic base in St Ives was The Mermaid Studio at 21 Fish Street, a former lemonade factory owned by the Tucker family and known locally as the 'Pop Factory'. After Coudrill retired it was converted into a restaurant by Australian actor Norman Coburn and is currently known as The Mermaid Seafood Restaurant.
