= News from Zoos =

Canadian children's television series

- Genre: Children's television
- Created by: Michael Spivak
- Written by: Jill MacFarlane
- Narrated by: Sandy Hoyt
- Country of origin: Canada
- Original language: English
- No. of seasons: 1

Production
- Producer: Michael Spivak
- Running time: 30 minutes

Original release
- Network: CBC Television
- Release: 18 October 1980 – 25 May 1981

News From Zoos is a Canadian children's television series that aired on CBC Television from 1980 to 1982.

== Premise ==
This series was hosted by a chimpanzee named Charlie, voiced by Carl Banas who presented news features about animals. Episodes included reports from the Jackson Zoo, where a sable antelope was born, and from the San Francisco Zoo. Animals featured on the series included a Komodo dragon, Chinese giant pandas and a seawolf.

== Scheduling ==
This half-hour series was broadcast on Mondays at 4:00 p.m. (Eastern) from 20 October 1980 to 25 May 1981. It was rebroadcast on Saturdays in the 1981 and 1982 seasons, and Friday afternoons in mid-1982.
