= Charles van Sandwyk =

Canadian artist, illustrator and writer (born 1966)

Charles Noel van Sandwyk (born 1966) is a Canadian artist, illustrator and writer.

== Background ==
Born in South Africa, van Sandwyk was exposed to art from an early age, as his father was a graphic designer. At age 12, he emigrated to Canada where his family settled in Deep Cove, North Vancouver, British Columbia. While a high school student he earned income by performing for children as a magician and unicyclist. His artistic ability began while still in elementary school, where he was an exceptional calligrapher, a talent he still uses in his illustrations. He experimented with copper plate etchings as a teen, and developed his unique style. He studied commercial art at Capilano College. At age 19, he travelled to Fiji and developed a deep connection with the South Pacific. For a number of years, he spent several months annually on the tiny island of Tavewa, five hours by boat from Fiji's main island of Viti Levu.

Some of van Sandwyk's paintings hang in the National Library of Canada, as well as in several important private collections. He is the writer and illustrator of several books including The Parade to Paradise, How to See Fairies, and Sketches from the Dream Island of Birds. He has provided illustrations for Folio Society editions of The Blue Fairy Book and The Wind in the Willows, and a Limited Centenary Edition of Wind In The Willows. His book, How to See Fairies, received its own Folio Society edition in 2018.

== Selected publications ==
- Selection of Neighbourly Birds of the New World (Canada). North Vancouver, BC:: Charles van Sandwyk, 1987. 36 pages. Limited edition of 126 copies.
- Five Endemic Species of Psittaciformes Found in the Fiji Islands: Handcoloured Etchings and Observations. Vancouver, BC: Charles van Sandwyk, 1990. 16 pages.
- Affairs of the Heart According to Birds. 1991.
- Strange Birds. North Vancouver, BC: Charles van Sandwyk, 1991. 18 pages.
- The Parade to Paradise. Vancouver, BC: Raincoast / Smithmark, 1992. 42 pages. Trade edition
- The Parade to Paradise. Vancouver, BC: Raincoast. 42 pages, 1992. Collector's edition. Signed, with an etching. Limited edition of 250 copies.
- How to See Fairies. North Vancouver, BC: Fairy Press, 1993. 16 pages.
- Wee Folk Drawn from Life. North Vancouver, BC: Charles van Sandwyk, 1994. 12 pages. Seattle Bookfair Award winner. Limited edition of 40 copies.
- Van Sandwyk's Bird & Bee Band. North Vancouver, BC: Charles van Sandwyk Fine Arts, 1994. 7 pages.
- Sketches From the Dream Island of Birds. North Vancouver, BC: Charles van Sandwyk, 1995. 28 pages. Limited edition of 200 copies.
- Selection of Neighbourly Birds of the New World (Canada). North Vancouver, BC: Charles van Sandwyk Fine Arts, 1995. 24 pages.
- Sketches From a Tropic Isle. North Vancouver, BC: Charles van Sandwyk, 1997. 28 pages.
- Van Sandwyk's Pocket Guide to the Little People. North Vancouver, BC: Fairy Press, 1997. 24 pages.
- Animal Wisdom. North Vancouver, BC: Charles van Sandwyk Fine Arts, 1999. 25 pages.
- Charles Van Sandwyk: An Interim Bibliography 1983 to 2000. Vancouver, BC: Heavenly Monkey & Charles van Sandwyk Fine Arts, 2000. 18 pages. Limited edition of 50 copies.
- The Gnome King's Treasure Song. North Vancouver, BC: Fairy Press, 2000. 16 pages.
- You Who for this Day Prepare. Vancouver, BC: Charles van Sandwyk, 2001. 16 pages. Limited edition of 15 copies.
- The Fairies' Christmas. North Vancouver, BC: Fairy Press, 2001. 4 pages.
- The Meaning of Mice. North Vancouver, BC: Fairy Press, 2002. 11 pages.
- Affairs of the Heart According to Peaceable Creatures. North Vancouver, BC: Charles van Sandwyk Fine Arts, 2003. 28 pages.
- Mr. Rabbit's Christmas Wish. North Vancouver, BC: Charles van Sandwyk Fine Arts, 2004. 16 pages.
- The Mouse & The Lizard: A Tale of Two Bookplates. Vancouver, BC: Heavenly Monkey, 2005. 21 pages.
- Twenty-One Years, Twenty-One Prints & Suites. North Vancouver, BC: Charles van Sandwyk pages, 2007. Limited edition of 10 copies.
- The Simple Line. Vancouver, BC: Heavenly Monkey Editions & Charles van Sandwyk Fine Arts, 2007. 11 pages. Limited edition of 50 copies.
- Mr Rabbit's Symphony of Nature. North Vancouver, BC: Charles van Sandwyk Fine Arts, 2008. 24 pages.
- Afterglow. North Vancouver, BC: Fairy Press, 2008. 8 pages.
- The Philosopher's Cupboard. Vancouver, BC: Savuti Press, 2009. 18 pages. Signed. Limited edition of 199 numbered copies.
- The Fairy Market. North Vancouver, BC: Fairy Press, 2009. 12 pages.
- Canadian Content. North Vancouver, BC: Charles van Sandwyk Fine Arts, 2009. 24 pages.
- Betwixt And Between: The Art and Influences of Charles van Sandwyk. North Vancouver, BC: Charles van Sandwyk Fine Arts, 2011. Signed. Limited edition of 100 copies.
- Will O' The Wisps (for Tiny Hands). North Vancouver, BC: Charles van Sandwyk, 2011. 9 unnumbered pages. Signed. Limited edition of 35 copies.
- Full Moon Eyes: An Ode to the Forbearance of Owls. North Vancouver, BC: Charles van Sandwyk Fine Arts, 2012. 18 pages.
- I Believe. 2012.
- Two Poems & A Hidden Thought. North Vancouver, BC: Savuti Press, 2012. 7 pages + 1 unnumbered page.
- An Unexpected Gift: The Untold Tale of Bartholomew the Green (Cousin to our beloved Father Christmas) who left the Comforts of Antarctica to Help Restore an Old-fashioned Christmas to a Wayward and Needy World. North Vancouver, BC: Charles van Sandwyk, 2013. 21 pages + 16 unnumbered pages of plates.
- Long Ago in Bangalore. North Vancouver, BC: Charles van Sandwyk Fine Arts, 2014. 4 unnumbered pages + 6 bookplates + 4 bookmarks.
