= The Reluctant Dragon (short story) =

Short story by Kenneth Grahame

"The Reluctant Dragon" is an 1898 children's story by Kenneth Grahame, originally published as a chapter in his book Dream Days. It is Grahame's most famous short story, arguably better known than Dream Days itself or the related 1895 collection The Golden Age. It can be seen as a prototype to most modern stories in which the dragon is a sympathetic character rather than a threat.

== Plot ==
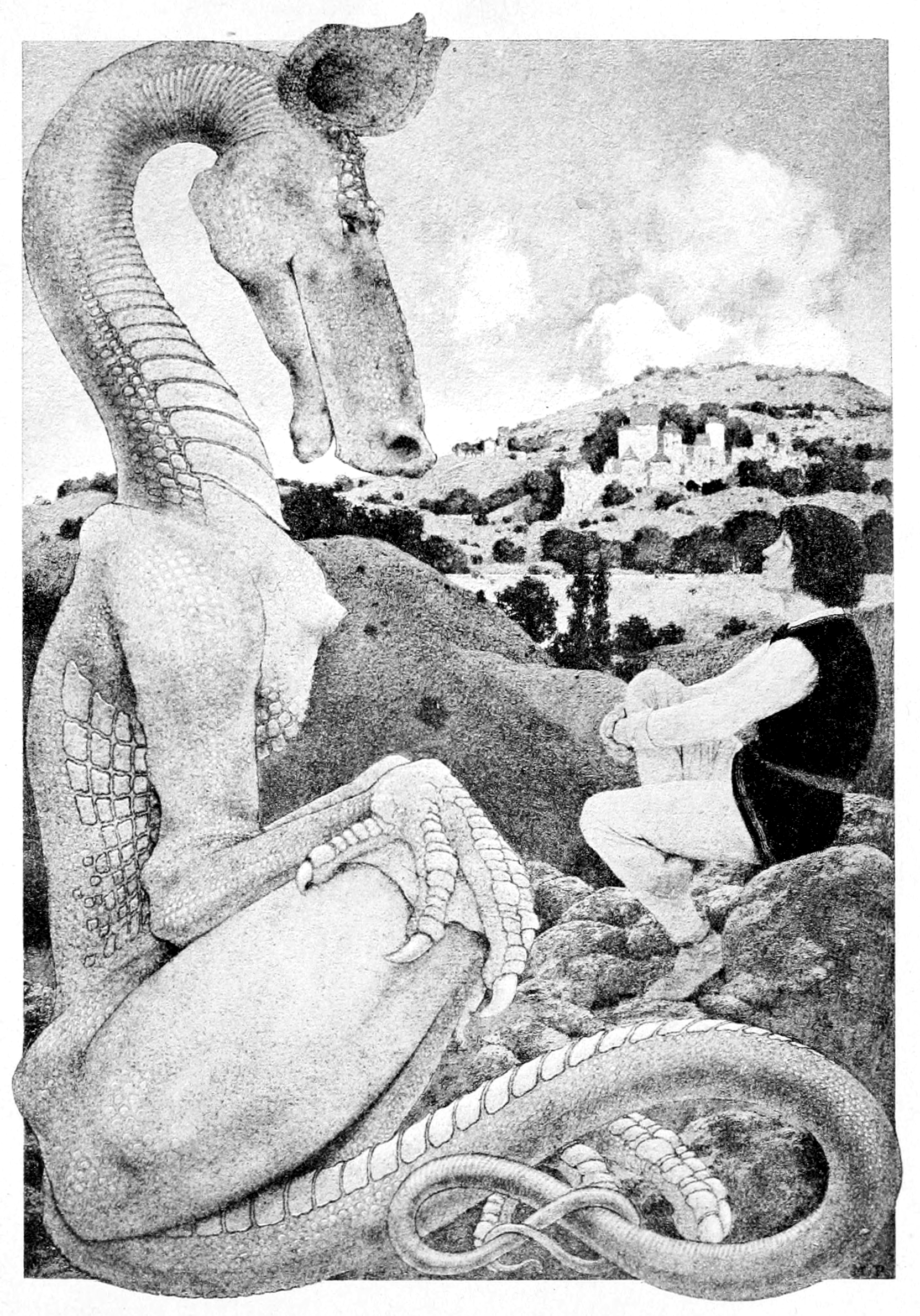
Illustration from Dream Days (1902) by Maxfield Parrish

The story takes place in the Berkshire Downs in Oxfordshire (where the author lived and where, according to legend, St. George did fight a dragon).

In Grahame's story, a young boy discovers an erudite, poetry-loving dragon living in the Downs above his home. The two become friends, but soon afterwards the dragon is discovered by the townsfolk, who send for St. George to rid them of him. The boy introduces St. George to the dragon, and the two decide that it would be better for them not to fight. Eventually, they decide to stage a fake joust between the two combatants. As the two have planned, St. George harmlessly spears the dragon through a shallow fold of skin suggested by the dragon, and the townsfolk rejoice (though not all of them, as some had placed bets on the dragon winning). St. George then proclaims that the dragon has been reformed, assuring the townsfolk he is not dangerous, and the dragon is accepted by the people.

== Reviews ==
One scholar described the book as "a story about language", such as the "dialect of the illiterate people", and the "literary aspirations of the dragon". The story also has an opening scene in which a little girl named Charlotte (a character from Grahame's The Golden Age) and a grown-up character find mysterious reptilian footprints in the snow and follow them, eventually finding a man who tells them the story of the Reluctant Dragon; two abridged versions (one by Robert D. San Souci and illustrated by John Segal and another abridged and illustrated by Inga Moore) both omit this scene. The New York Times review by Emily Jenkins noted that this framework is somewhat long-winded and might cause some parents to worry about whether the story can keep children's attention, but she found the unabridged version preferable to both abridgments (although she said that "Moore retains the pure joy of the author's descriptive passages").

Peter Green, in his 1959 biography of Grahame, wrote that while the story can be viewed as a satire like Don Quixote, the characters can be seen on a deeper level as representing different sides of the author himself: St. George represents Grahame as a public servant who works for the Establishment while the Dragon represents his anarchic, artistic, and anti-social side.

== Legacy ==
The story served as the key element to the 1941 feature film with the same name, from Walt Disney Productions. The story has also been set to music as a children's operetta by John Rutter, with words by David Grant. In 1960, it was presented as a live-action episode starring John Raitt as St. George, on the television anthology The Shirley Temple Show. On 21 March 1968, Burr Tillstrom and Kukla, Fran and Ollie starred in a puppet version on NBC. In 1965, Hanna-Barbera Records produced one of the first children's album versions of the story, featuring cartoon characters Touché Turtle and Dum Dum, giving the tale a modern allegory about prejudice. In 1970–1971, it formed part of the anthology television program The Reluctant Dragon & Mr. Toad Show. In 1987, Cosgrove Hall Films adapted it for Thames ITV. In 2004, Candlewick Press published the story as a picture book, with dozens of illustrations by Inga Moore. In 2008, Tony DiTerlizzi wrote Kenny & the Dragon as a tribute to Grahame's story, including naming the two heroes Kenneth and Grahame. The Mexican animated film franchise Leyendas uses multiple elements from the book.
