= Dream Days =

Collection of children's fiction by Kenneth Grahame

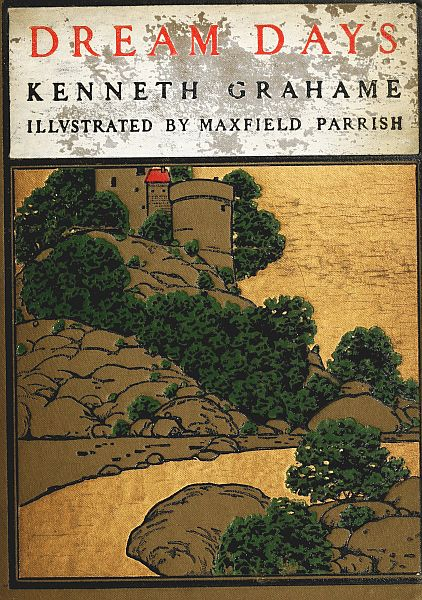
Cover of the first illustrated edition (John Lane, The Bodley Head, 1902)

Dream Days is a collection of children's fiction and reminiscences of childhood written by Kenneth Grahame. A sequel to the 1895 collection The Golden Age (some of its selections feature the same family of five children), Dream Days was first published in 1898 by The Bodley Head. The first six selections in the book had been previously published in periodicals of the day – in The Yellow Book and the New Review in Britain and in Scribner's Magazine in the U.S. The book is best known for its inclusion of Grahame's classic story "The Reluctant Dragon".

Like its precursor volume, Dream Days received strong approval from the literary critics of the day. In the decades since, the book has perhaps suffered a reputation as a thinner and weaker sequel to The Golden Age, except for its single hit story. In one modern estimation, both books "paint a convincingly unsentimental picture of childhood, with the adults in these sketches totally out of touch with the real concerns of the young people around them, including their griefs and rages".

As with The Golden Age, the first edition of Dream Days was un-illustrated; like the prior volume, a subsequent edition of Dream Days was published with illustrations by Maxfield Parrish, also from John Lane. Lane's first intention was to print colour plates but he was not satisfied with the colour reproductions of Parrish's pictures. Instead Lane chose a new photogravure reproduction process that produced black-and-white results superior to the halftone images in the 1899 edition of The Golden Age. The Parrish-illustrated edition of Dream Days was issued in London and New York by The Bodley Head in 1902; it contained ten full-page illustrations (one for each of the eight selections plus frontispiece and title page) and six tailpieces. The quality of the images in Dream Days inspired Lane to issue a matching edition of The Golden Age, with improved photogravure plates, in 1904.

In the United States, the first edition of Dream Days sold for $1.25 per copy.

== Contents ==
- The Twenty-first of October
- Dies irae
- Mutabile Semper
- The Magic Ring
- Its Walls Were as of Jasper
- A Saga of the Seas
- The Reluctant Dragon
- A Departure
