= Peter Forster (wood engraver) =

British wood engraver (1934–2021)

- Born: 1934; Fulham, London
- Died: 20 January 2021 (aged 86–87)
- Known for: Wood engraver

Peter Shane Cavanagh Forster (1934 – 20 January 2021) was an English wood engraver, artist and printmaker, making illustrations for The Folio Society, The Times, The Observer and Saatchi & Saatchi, together with a number of other publications. He was one of the first wood engravers to use colour in his printmaking. In 2005 he was asked by The Royal Mint to design the £2 coin to recognise the 400th anniversary of the Gunpowder Plot.

== Early life ==
Forster was born in Fulham in 1934, the son of Harold Forster, who served in the Royal Air Force, and Mabel (née Fairy). He was educated at Bedford Modern School, the Luton School of Art and at the Ruskin School of Art. For his National Service, he followed his father into the Royal Air Force.

== Career ==
Following National Service, he taught at Bedford School for one year, but left as teaching was not a profession for him. Forster then pursued a career as a book illustrator on a freelance basis before taking up employment in the graphic design studio at the Department of the Environment in 1964 with the task of designing guide books. He considered that 'he'd sold his soul' and left in 1985 to continue work as a wood engraver in a private capacity. In particular he aligned his love of literature and art working with the Folio Society. He illustrated seven complete Folio Society volumes including works by Chaucer, Shakespeare, Jane Austen and George Eliot, among others.

Forster was a friend of Merlin Holland, the grandson of Oscar Wilde. His interest in Wilde led him to illustrate Wilde's De Profundis, on behalf of the Folio Society, and he also made illustrations for The Ballad of Reading Gaol, again for the Folio Society. He also made a series of colour prints entitled A New Temple of British Worthies including prints of Florence Nightingale, Charles I, and Jane Austen and later a collection of engravings presenting the royal family as mythical creatures.

In 2005 he was asked by The Royal Mint to design the £2 coin to recognise the 400th anniversary of the Gunpowder Plot.

== Private life ==
In 2006, Forster entered into a civil partnership with Hugh White. Forster stated that: “I do not believe in the life to come but opening the south door of a village church and stepping down into the cool, whitewashed interior is one of the sweetest things in life, a sensation unchanged since schooldays; the experience of life that was.” Forster died on 20 January 2021, aged 86.

== Selected publications ==
- Forster, Peter (1986). A publicity vignette : Peter Forster, wood engraver. OCLC 221498576.
- Forster, Peter (1986). The abdication : a quinquagenarian retrospection. OCLC 21461659.
- Forster, Peter (1983). Britannic majesty : a set of woodengravings. OCLC 12854495.
