= Cookham Dean =

Village in Berkshire, England

Coordinates: 51°33′25″N 0°44′46″W

- Village
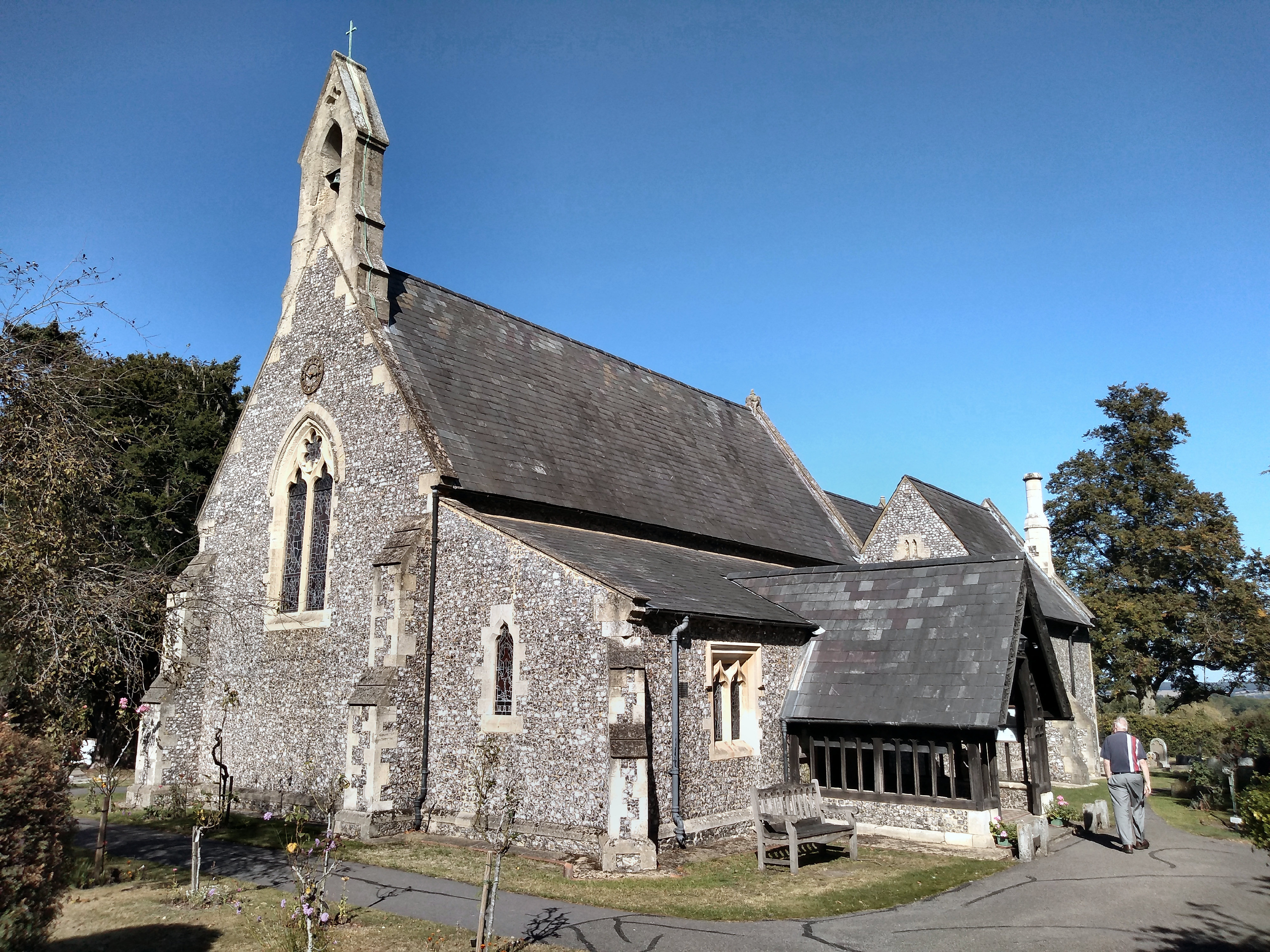
- St John the Baptist church, Cookham Dean

- Location within Berkshire
- Civil parish: Cookham
- Shire county: Berkshire
- Region: South East
- Country: England
- Sovereign state: United Kingdom
- Post town: MAIDENHEAD
- Postcode district: SL6
- Dialling code: 01628
- Police: Thames Valley
- Fire: Royal Berkshire
- Ambulance: South Central
- UK Parliament: Maidenhead

Cookham Dean is a village to the west of the village of Cookham in Berkshire, England. It is the highest point of all the Cookhams (Cookham Rise, Cookham Village and Cookham Dean).

== Commerce ==
Cookham Dean is served by two pubs, Uncle Tom's Cabin and The Jolly Farmer, a restaurant called The Mango Lounge (opened in late 2016) at the Chequers and a hotel/inn called The Sanctum on The Green. There are no shops in the village following the closure of the Post Office in 2009. There is an additional pub, The Bounty, on the river bank with access only by foot or boat and open in the summer and winter weekends.

== Geography ==
Cookham Dean has a site of Special Scientific Interest (SSSI) and local nature reserve on the western edge of the village, called Bisham Woods. It neighbours Cookham Village, Marlow, Furze Platt and Pinkneys Green.

== Notable residents ==
The village was the home of actor and comedian Tim Brooke-Taylor (1940–2020), who was involved in local events. Russian Princess Sofka Skipwith (1907–1994) lived with her second husband, Grey Skipwith, at Dean Cottage in the 1930s.

The author and banker Kenneth Grahame lived at The Mount as a child with his grandmother and uncle after his mother died. He then returned to the village after retiring from the Bank of England, living in a house called Mayfield.
