= The Golden Age (Grahame book) =

1895 book by Kenneth Grahame

The Golden Age is a collection of reminiscences of childhood, written by Kenneth Grahame and first published in book form in 1895, by The Bodley Head in London and by Stone & Kimball in Chicago. The Prologue and six of the stories had previously appeared in the National Observer, the journal then edited by William Ernest Henley. Widely praised upon its first appearance, the book has come to be regarded as a classic in its genre. Algernon Charles Swinburne, writing in the Daily Chronicle, called it "one of the few books which are well-nigh too praiseworthy for praise".

Typical of his culture and his era, Grahame casts his reminiscences in imagery and metaphor rooted in the culture of Ancient Greece; to the children whose impressions are recorded in the book, the adults in their lives are "Olympians", while the chapter titled "The Argonauts" refers to Perseus, Apollo, Psyche, and similar figures of Greek mythology. Grahame's reminiscences, in The Golden Age and in the later Dream Days (1898), were notable for their conception "of a world where children are locked in perpetual warfare with the adult 'Olympians' who have wholly forgotten how it feels to be young" – a theme later explored by J. M. Barrie and other authors.

The first editions were not illustrated. An edition published in Britain and America by The Bodley Head in 1899 featured halftone black-and-white artwork by Maxfield Parrish, which contains 19 full-page illustrations and twelve tailpieces. The full-page pictures were a frontispiece and one accompanying each of the eighteen chapters. In 1904, John Lane published another edition with new photogravure reproductions of the Parrish pictures, matching the first illustrated edition of Dream Days (1902).

A 1915 edition contains 19 full-page colour illustrations by R. J. Enraght-Moony. An edition was published by John Lane in 1921 with illustrations by Lois Lenski and an edition illustrated by E. H. Shepard was issued in 1928.

== Contents ==
- Prologue: The Olympians
- A Holiday
- A White-Washed Uncle
- Alarums and Excursions
- The Finding of the Princess
- Sawdust and Sin
- "Young Adam Cupid"
- The Burglars
- A Harvesting
- Snowbound
- What They Talked About
- The Argonauts
- The Roman Road
- The Secret Drawer
- "Exit Tyrannus"
- The Blue Room
- A Falling Out
- "Lusisti Satis"
