= Kenneth Grahame =

Scottish writer (1859–1932)

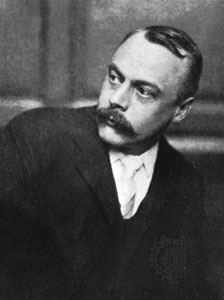
- Grahame in 1910
- Born: 8 March 1859; Edinburgh, Scotland
- Died: 6 July 1932 (aged 73); Pangbourne, England
- Resting place: Holywell Cemetery, St Cross Church, Oxford
- Occupations: Children's author; Banker
- Spouse: Elspeth Thomson (m. 1899)
- Children: 1
- Writing career
- Genre: Fiction
- Notable work: The Wind in the Willows (1908)

Kenneth Grahame (/ˈɡreɪ.əm/ GRAY-əm; 8 March 1859 – 6 July 1932) was a Scottish writer. He is best remembered for the classic of children's literature The Wind in the Willows (1908). Born in Scotland, he spent most of his childhood with his grandmother in England, following the death of his mother and his father's inability to look after the children. After attending St Edward's School in Oxford, his ambition to attend university was thwarted and he joined the Bank of England, where he had a successful career. Before writing The Wind in the Willows, he published three other books: Pagan Papers (1893), The Golden Age (1895), and Dream Days (1898).

== Biography ==
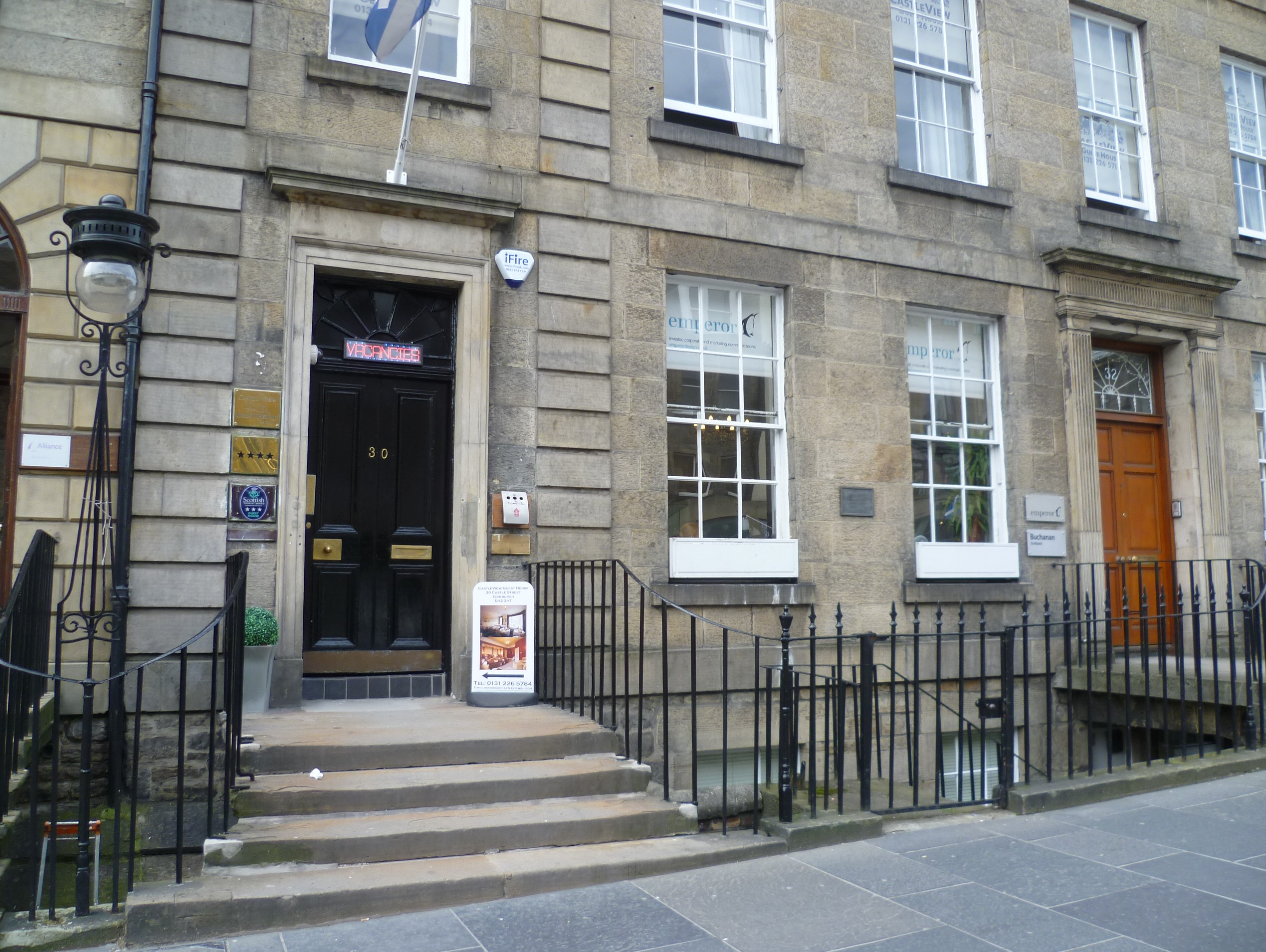
Grahame's birthplace in Castle Street in Edinburgh

=== Early life ===
Grahame was born on 8 March 1859 at 32 Castle Street in Edinburgh. His parents were James Cunningham Grahame (1830–1887), advocate, and Elizabeth Ingles (1837–1864). When Grahame was a little more than a year old, his father was appointed as sheriff-substitute in Argyllshire, and the family moved to Inveraray on Loch Fyne with Grahame, his older sister, Helen, and his older brother, Thomas William (known as Willie). In March 1864, Grahame's younger brother, Roland, was born and the following month Grahame's mother died of scarlet fever. Grahame contracted the disease and was seriously ill. Although he recovered, he was left vulnerable to chest infections for the rest of his life.

After their mother's death, the four children were sent to live with their maternal grandmother at The Mount, a large house in extensive grounds in Cookham Dean in Berkshire, while their grieving father remained in Scotland and took to drink. Also living at The Mount was Grahame's uncle David Ingles, who was the curate at the local church and took the children boating on the River Thames at nearby Bisham. The children were supported financially by Grahame's paternal uncle, John Grahame, who was a parliamentary agent in London. In the spring of 1866, after the collapse of a chimney at The Mount, the children moved with their grandmother to Fernhill Cottage in Cranbourne. Later that year, Grahame's father recalled the children to Scotland but the arrangement did not work out and the children returned to Cranbourne in 1867, while their father resigned his post in Scotland, went to live in France and had no further contact with his children.

In 1868, when he was nine years old, Grahame became a boarder at the recently established St Edward's School in Oxford. He was successful at school both academically and in sport, winning prizes for divinity and Latin in 1874 and the sixth form prize in 1875, captaining the rugby fifteen, and becoming head boy. Holidays were spent at Cranbourne or with his naval commander uncle, Jack Ingles, and his children in Portsmouth and London. It was during a Christmas holiday in London in 1875 that Grahame's brother, Willie, died of a chest infection.

=== Career ===
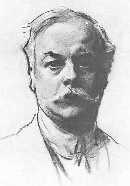
Drawing of Grahame by John Singer Sargent

While he was at school, Grahame dreamt of attending Oxford University, but his uncle, John Grahame, was opposed to the idea and refused to finance it. Instead, Grahame began work as a clerk in his uncle's firm of parliamentary agents Grahame, Currie and Spens. While working in the Westminster office, he lodged with another uncle, Robert Grahame, in Fulham, joined the London Scottish Volunteers and, having met Frederick James Furnivall in a Soho restaurant, became a member of the New Shakspere Society.

On 1 January 1879, aged nineteen, Grahame entered the Bank of England in Threadneedle Street in the City of London as a "gentleman clerk". He stayed at the Bank for nearly thirty years, working his way up to become its youngest Secretary (one of the Bank's three highest officers) at the age of thirty-nine. In the entrance examination to become a clerk, Grahame had scored the highest marks of his intake, and became the only candidate to score 100 per cent in the English Essay paper. To be nearer his work, Grahame took lodgings in Bloomsbury Street, which he later shared with his brother Roland, who also worked at the Bank. In 1882 he moved into a flat in Chelsea, where he lived on his own and caught the ferry to work. In 1884 he became a volunteer at Toynbee Hall, working with impoverished youths from the East End of London. Summer holidays with his sister, Helen, were spent in Cornwall and Italy, both of which remained favourite destinations throughout his life.

Grahame's work at the Bank left him time to pursue his literary interests. He had been jotting down his thoughts in prose and verse in a bank ledger, but it was not until 1887 that he started to submit stories and essays to periodicals. His first published piece appeared in St James's Gazette in December 1888. He was then invited to become a regular contributor to the National Observer by its editor, the poet William Ernest Henley, who tried to persuade him to give up his position with the Bank and become a full-time writer. In 1893 Henley encouraged Grahame to send a collection of his short stories and essays to John Lane at his publishing house, The Bodley Head. The collection was published with the title Pagan Papers and illustrations by Aubrey Beardsley, and was well received by critics. Grahame was now in demand as a writer, and became a regular contributor to The Bodley Head's periodical The Yellow Book. In 1894 Grahame took a lease on a house in the Kensington Crescent (now demolished) in Kensington, which he shared with another writer, Tom Greg, until the latter's marriage, and their housekeeper, Sarah Bath.

The Golden Age, published in 1895, is a collection of stories about four children being brought up by aunts and uncles referred to as the Olympians. Some of the chapters had already been published in Pagan Papers while most had appeared in the National Observer and other periodicals. The book made Grahame famous and established him as a leading authority on childhood. The poet Algernon Swinburne said that the book was "well-nigh too praiseworthy for praise". A sequel, Dream Days, followed in 1898, the year that Grahame was appointed Secretary of the Bank of England. Dream Days included stories published in periodicals over the past four years; a new story was The Reluctant Dragon.

In 1897 Grahame met Elspeth (Elsie) Thomson, the daughter of Robert William Thomson and sister of Courtauld Thomson. Elsie had written a novel, as well as plays and poems. Having lost both her parents, she was living in Onslow Square with her stepfather, John Fletcher Moulton, who was a Liberal Member of Parliament. Grahame and Elsie married on 22 July 1899 at the Church of St Fimbarrus, Fowey, Cornwall. Grahame had been recovering from pneumonia with his friend Arthur Quiller Couch and family in Fowey. The best man at the wedding was Grahame's cousin, the writer Anthony Hope. Grahame's sister, Helen, disapproved of the marriage, thinking that the couple were temperamentally unsuited to each other, and the brother and sister became estranged. The couple set up home in Durham Villas (now Phillimore Place) in Kensington, where their only child, Alastair (nicknamed Mouse) was born prematurely in 1900 with a congenital cataract that left him blind in one eye. Grahame told his son bedtime stories about a mole, a beaver and a water-rat, and the letters he wrote when Alastair was holidaying with his nanny in Littlehampton in 1907, while his parents were in Falmouth, Cornwall, included stories about a toad. These stories about animals have been seen as the source for The Wind in the Willows.

In 1903 Grahame had a narrow escape when a man entered the Bank of England and took three shots at him with a revolver, missing each time. The man, George Frederick Robinson, was overpowered and arrested. After a trial at the Old Bailey, at which he was found guilty but insane, he was sent to Broadmoor Hospital. Grahame never completely recovered from the shock of this incident and it may have contributed to his early retirement from the Bank.

=== Retirement and later life ===
Grahame retired from the Bank in 1908, aged forty-nine, ostensibly on grounds of ill-health. In his resignation letter Grahame stated that his health was being affected by his work. A different explanation for Grahame's retirement was offered by a former colleague, W. Marston Acres, who wrote in 1950 that Grahame's resentment of the bullying manner of a director during a discussion about official business provoked him into accusing the director of being "no gentleman". Marston Acres believed that the director in question was Walter Cunliffe, who later became Governor of the Bank of England. On leaving the Bank, Grahame was awarded an annual pension of £400, although he could have expected to receive £710. In 1906 he had taken out a lease on a house called Mayfield (later Herries Preparatory School) in Cookham Dean, close to where he grew up.

The Wind in the Willows was published in 1908, four months after Grahame's resignation from the Bank. Rejected by Everybody's Magazine in the United States and by Grahame's usual British publisher, The Bodley Head, the book was eventually published in the United Kingdom by Methuen, with an American edition published by Scribner. Reviews were generally unfavourable; a reviewer in The Times wrote: "Grown-up readers will find it monstrous and elusive, children will hope, in vain, for more fun." A rare positive review appeared in Vanity Fair, where Richard Middleton wrote that it was "the best book ever written for children and one of the best written for adults". The book sold well and continued to sell well, reaching 100 impressions in the United Kingdom in 1951. In 1910 the Grahames moved from Cookham Dean to a farmhouse, Boham's, in the village of Blewbury near Oxford.

Grahame's son Alastair flourished at The Old Malthouse School, but went on to have brief and less happy experiences at Rugby School and Eton College before having lessons with a private tutor to prepare for the University of Oxford. During the First World War Grahame did war work in the village, setting up a factory for surgical supplies, while Alastair was rejected for active service, probably on account of his poor eyesight, and went up to Christ Church, Oxford in 1918. On 7 May 1920 Alastair's body was found on the railway line near a level crossing in Oxford. Although the jury at the inquest returned a verdict of accidental death, rumours of suicide persisted. He was buried in Holywell Cemetery in Oxford on 12 May 1920, his twentieth birthday.

Following the death of their son, Grahame and Elsie went to Italy and spent several years travelling. When they returned to England, they settled at Church Cottage in the village of Pangbourne, where Grahame died of a cerebral haemorrhage on 6 July 1932. He was buried at the Church of St James the Less in Pangbourne, with his body later being removed to Holywell Cemetery to be buried with Alastair. Grahame's cousin, Anthony Hope, wrote his epitaph: "To the beautiful memory of Kenneth Grahame, husband of Elspeth and father of Alastair, who passed the river on the 6th of July, 1932, leaving childhood and literature through him the more blest for all time." Elsie survived her husband by fourteen years. Grahame bequeathed the royalties from his works to the Bodleian Library, which also holds his archive.

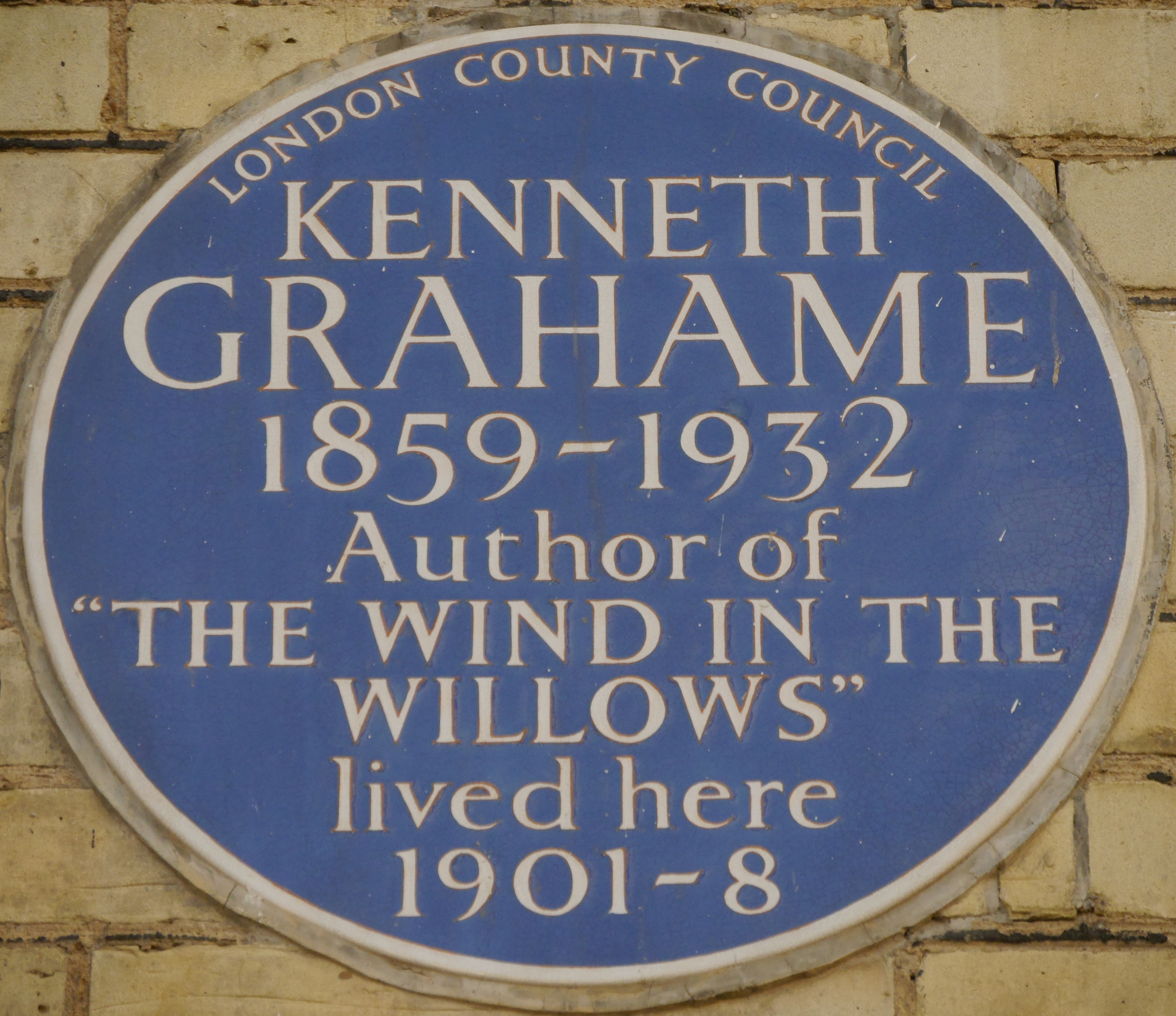
Blue plaque, 16 Phillimore Place, London, home during 1901–1908

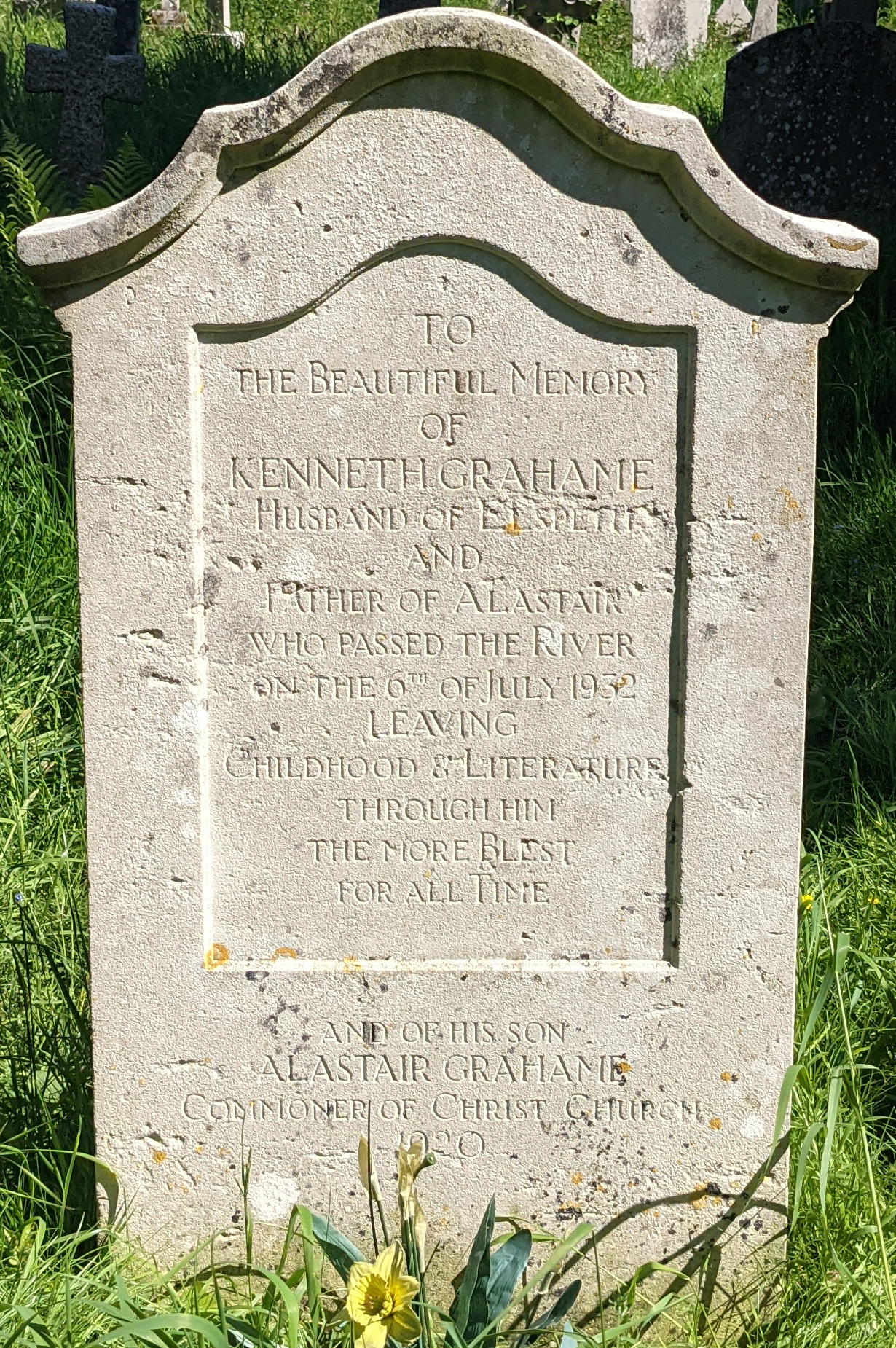
Grahame's headstone in Holywell Cemetery, Oxford

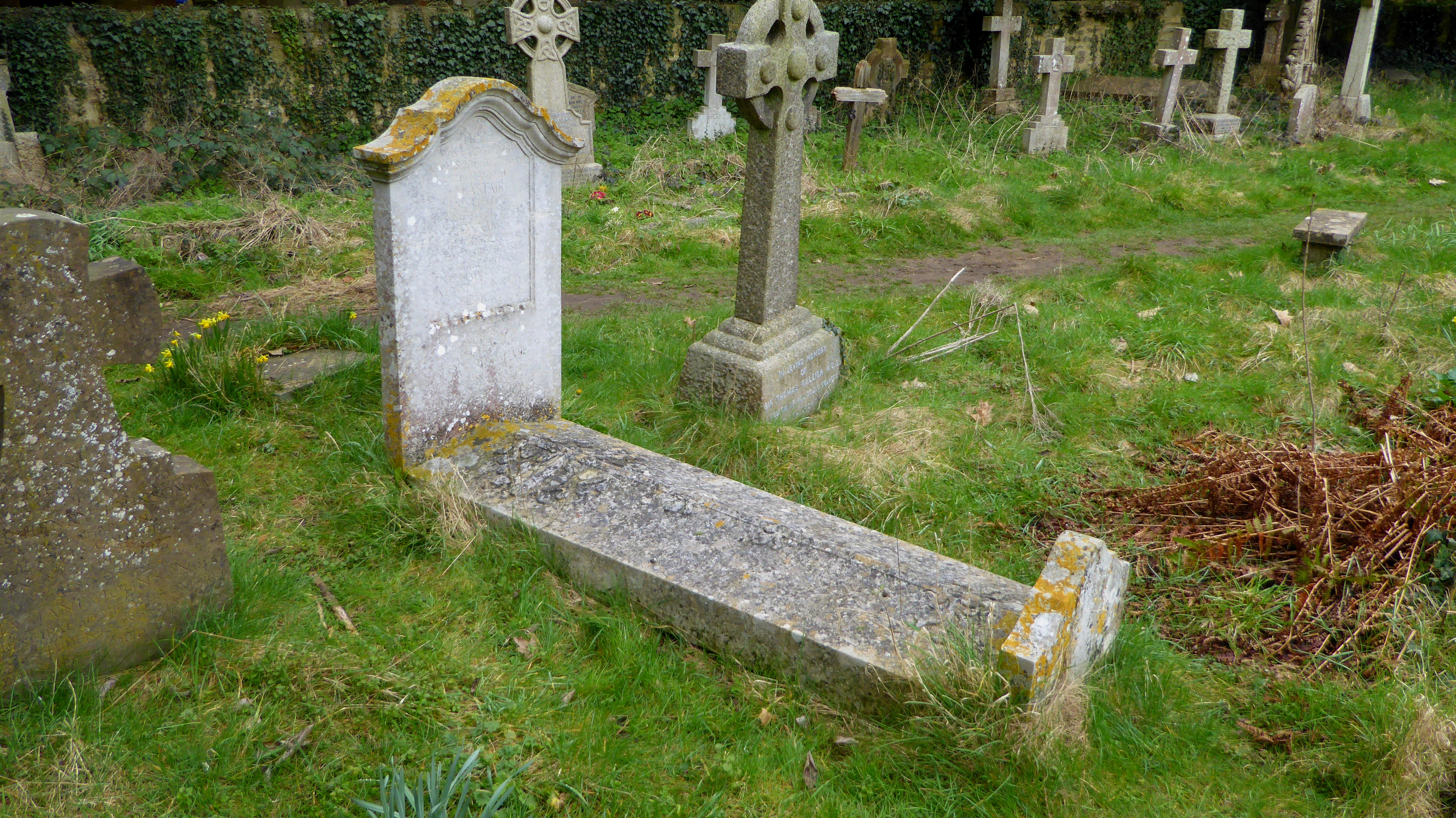
Alastair Grahame's grave at Holywell Cemetery, Oxford

== Works ==
- Pagan Papers (1894)
- The Golden Age (1895)
- The Headswoman (1898)
- Dream Days (1898), including "The Reluctant Dragon"
- The Wind in the Willows (1908), later illustrated by E. H. Shepard
- First Whisper of "The Wind in the Willows" (1944), a collection of Grahame's letters to his small son, published by his widow Elspeth Grahame
