= Hardwick House, Oxfordshire =

Hardwick House
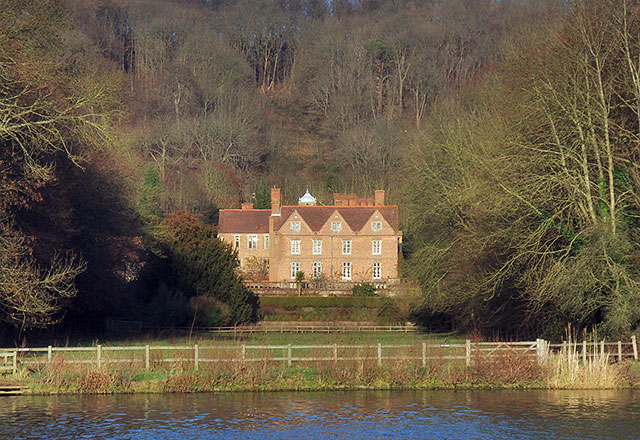

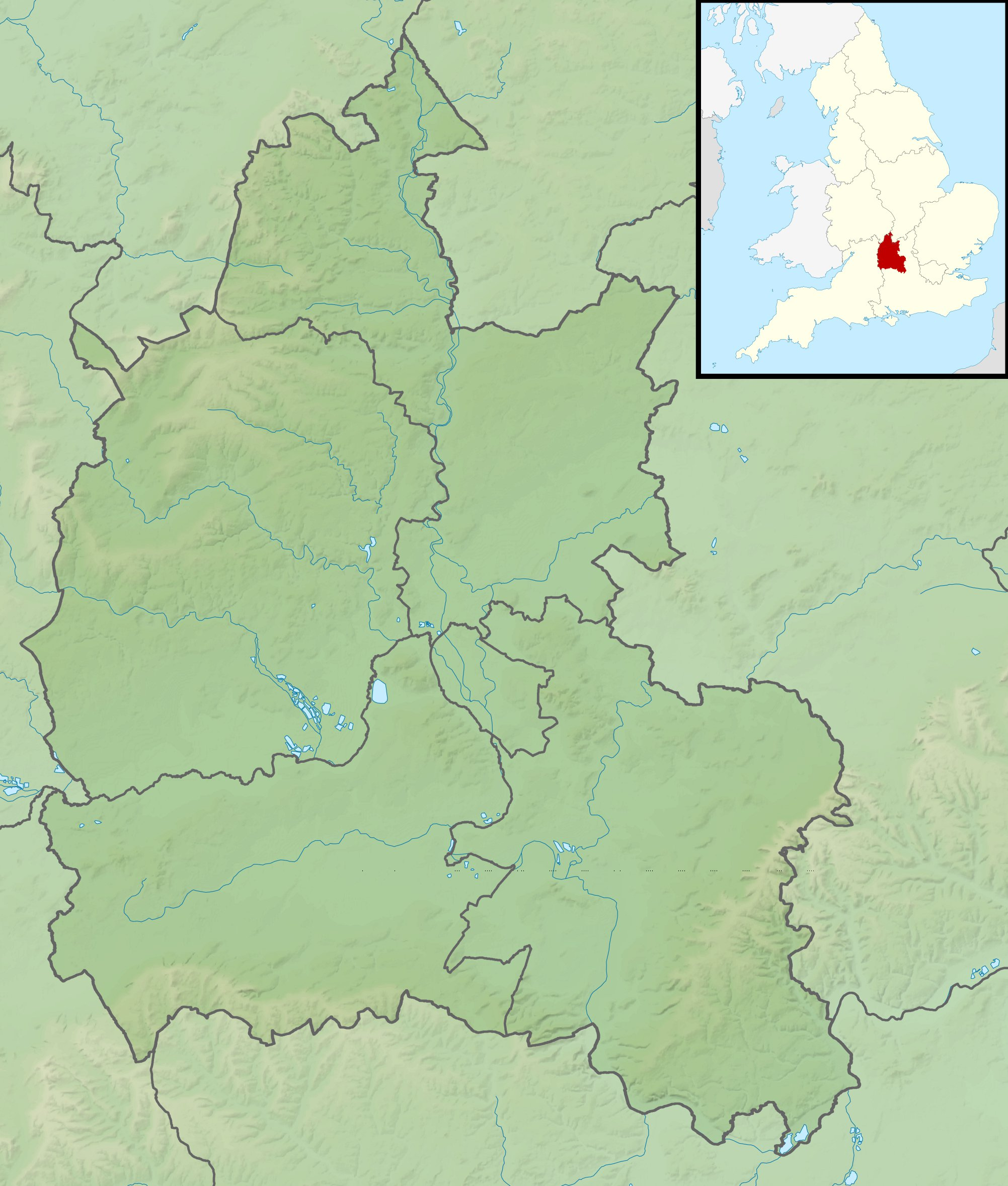
- Location within Oxfordshire
- 51.4947°N 1.0516°W
- Type: House
- Location: Whitchurch-on-Thames, Oxfordshire

History
- Built: early 16th century with later additions

Site notes
- Governing body: Privately owned

Listed Building – Grade I
- Official name: Hardwick House
- Designated: 24 October 1951
- Reference no.: 1180567

Listed Building – Grade I
- Official name: Hardwick House dower house
- Designated: 16 August 1985
- Reference no.: 1059525

Listed Building – Grade II
- Official name: Hardwick House stables
- Designated: 16 August 1985
- Reference no.: 1059482

Listed Building – Grade II
- Official name: Hardwick House wall
- Designated: 16 August 1985
- Reference no.: 1059483

Listed Building – Grade II
- Official name: Hardwick House pier
- Designated: 16 August 1985
- Reference no.: 1180578

Hardwick House is a Tudor house on the banks of the River Thames on a slight rise at Whitchurch-on-Thames in the English county of Oxfordshire. It is reputed to have been the inspiration for E. H. Shepard's illustrations of Toad Hall in the book The Wind in the Willows by Kenneth Grahame, although this is also claimed by Mapledurham House, Fowey Hall Hotel, Foxwarren Park and Fawley Court.

== History ==
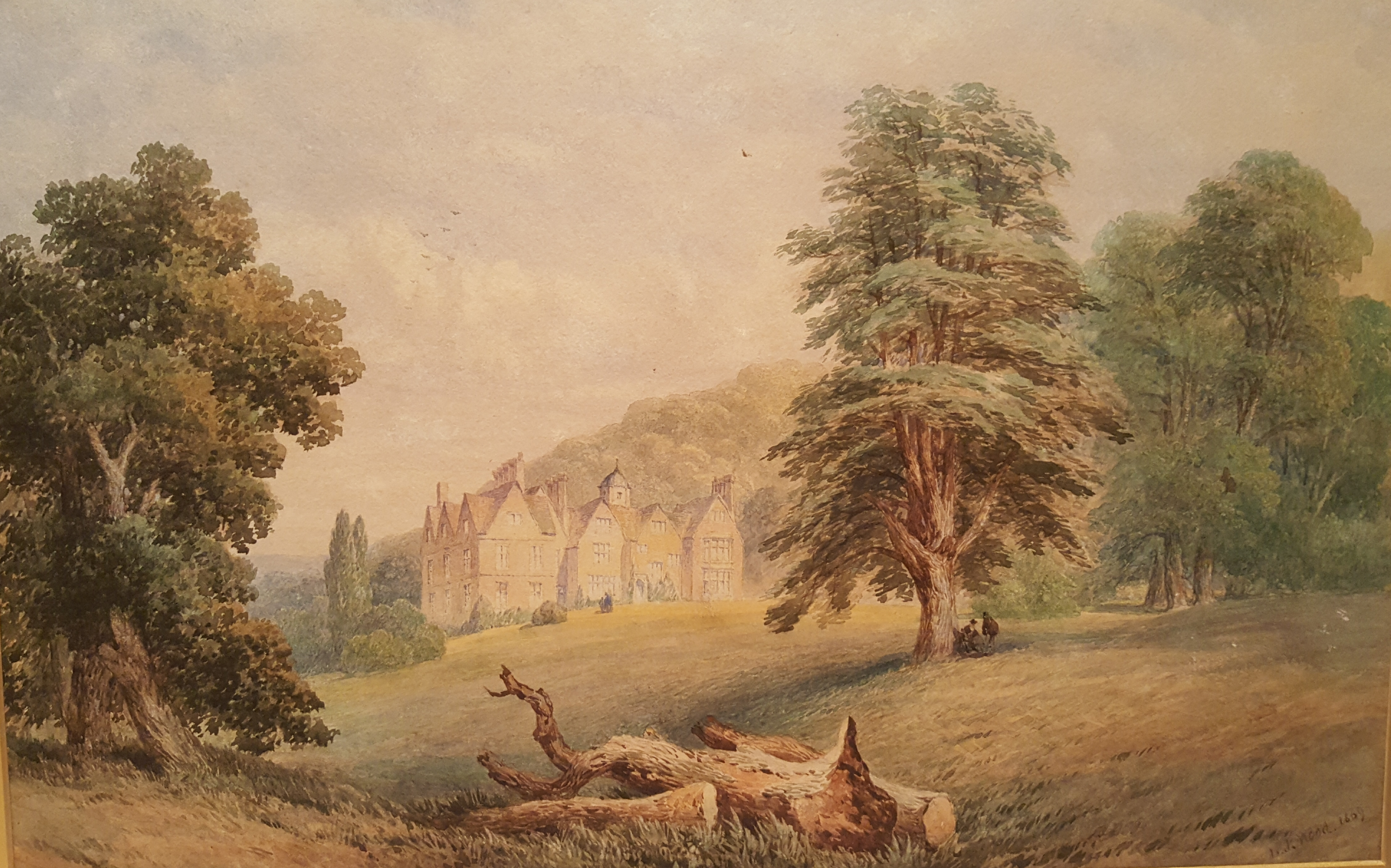
A watercolour of Hardwick House painted by Lewis John Wood RI in 1869

King Charles I of England visited the house while he was a prisoner on escort from Oxford.

Hardwick House was bought by Richard Lybbe in 1526; that family ended in an heiress Isabella Lybbe who married Philip Powys in 1730 and their Powys descendants had their home there for a further 130 years. Caroline Powys, wife of Philip Lybbe Powys of Hardwick House maintained a diary from 1756 which recorded the daily social round of her class in gossipy detail. She wrote of visits to neighbouring country houses, the winter balls and assemblies in Henley and the seasons in London and Bath with their plays, concerts and balls. Their great-grandson Philip Lybbe Powys, who later assumed the additional surname of Lybbe, was a rower and MP. He recalled as a child rowing from Hardwick to Mapledurham on Sunday afternoons.

Charles Day Rose purchased Hardwick House shortly before he was created a baronet of "Hardwick House in the Parish of Whitchurch in the County of Oxford" on 19 July 1909. Rose is said to have been one of the models for "Toad" of Toad Hall in The Wind in the Willows. Hardwick House and its surrounding estate have been in the ownership of the Baronets Rose of Hardwick for several generations and the current owner is Sir Julian Rose, 4th Baronet, who succeeded his father in 1966. In 1979 he also succeeded to the Rose Baronetcy of Montreal, and became the 5th Baronet in that line.

Hardwick House is a Grade I listed building, as is the adjacent dower house. The stables, and garden wall and gate pier have their own Grade II listings.

== Quotations ==
To Nature in my earliest youth,
I vowed my constancy and truth;
Wherein lie Hardwick's much loved shade,
Enamoured of her charms I strayed,
And as I roved the woods among,
Her praise in lisping numbers sung.

— Dean Powys

A little above Mapledurham lock you pass Hardwick House, where Charles I played bowls.

— Jerome K. Jerome

== See also ==
- Toad of Toad Hall
