= Trench Green =

Hamlet in Oxfordshire, England

Coordinates: 51.494722°N 1.015833°W

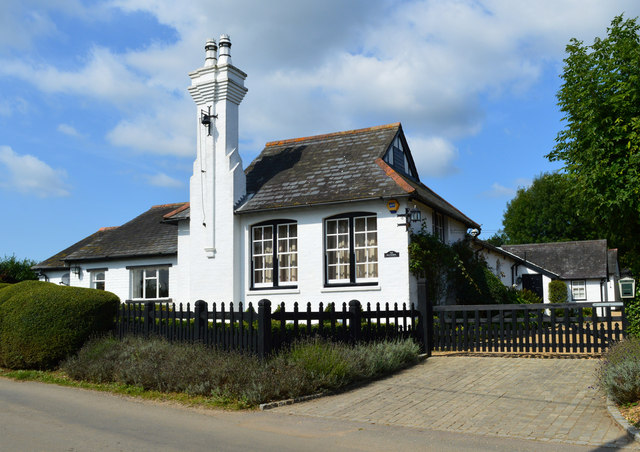
- The Old School in Trench Green

- Location within Oxfordshire
- OS grid reference: SU683778
- Civil parish: Mapledurham
- District: South Oxfordshire
- Shire county: Oxfordshire
- Region: South East
- Country: England
- Sovereign state: United Kingdom
- Post town: Reading
- Postcode district: RG4
- Dialling code: 0118
- Police: Thames Valley
- Fire: Oxfordshire
- Ambulance: South Central
- UK Parliament: Henley

Trench Green is a hamlet in Oxfordshire about 1 mile (1.6 km) northeast of the village of Mapledurham and about 4 miles (6.4 km) northwest of Reading in neighbouring Berkshire. It is situated on the rural road from Caversham to Goring Heath and Goring-on-Thames, at its junction with the access lane to Mapledurham village. For local government purposes Trench Green is in Mapledurham civil parish, which forms part of the district of South Oxfordshire within the county of Oxfordshire. It is within the Henley constituency of the United Kingdom Parliament. Prior to Brexit in 2020, the village was represented by the South East England constituency in the European Parliament. Although barely more than a few houses around the road junction, Trench Green does contain a former school, which is now a house, and the parish's parish hall.
