= Chazey Heath =

Hamlet in Oxfordshire, England

Coordinates: 51.4922°N 1.0032°W

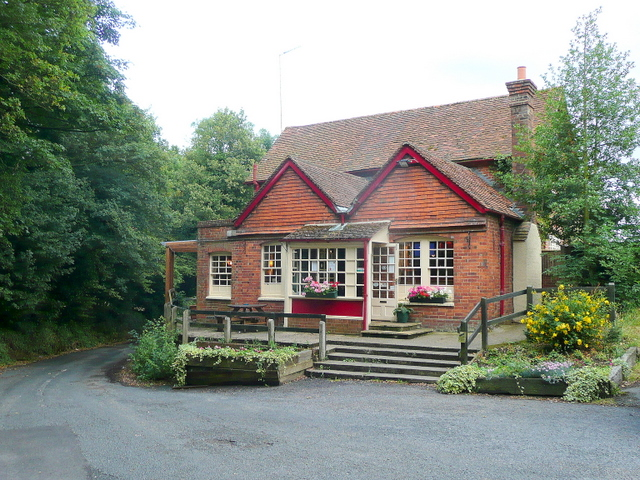
- The Pack Saddle public house in Chazey Heath

- Location within Oxfordshire
- OS grid reference: SU6977
- Civil parish: Mapledurham
- District: South Oxfordshire
- Shire county: Oxfordshire
- Region: South East
- Country: England
- Sovereign state: United Kingdom
- Post town: Reading
- Postcode district: RG49
- Dialling code: 0118
- Police: Thames Valley
- Fire: Oxfordshire
- Ambulance: South Central
- UK Parliament: Henley

Chazey Heath is a hamlet in Oxfordshire, England, about 3 miles (4.8 km) north of Reading, Berkshire. It is situated on the A4074 road, between Caversham and Oxford, at its junction with the rural road to Goring Heath and Goring-on-Thames. For local government purposes Chazey Heath is in Mapledurham civil parish, which forms part of the district of South Oxfordshire within the county of Oxfordshire. It is within the Henley constituency of the United Kingdom Parliament. Prior to Brexit in 2020, it was represented by the South East England constituency for the European Parliament.

There are two roadside public houses on the A4074 in Chazey Heath, the Pack Saddle and the Pack Horse, some 0.5 miles (0.80 km) apart. There are also two golf clubs, the Caversham Heath Golf Club and the Mapledurham Golf Club, on opposite sides of the road.

This hamlet contains 62 buildings (53 houses). It has a local park by the border with Tokers Green. Local primary schools are Kidmore End Primary, Sonning Common Primary and Peppard Primary. Local secondary schools are Maiden Erlegh Chiltern Edge, Gillotts School and Langtree School.

== Gallery ==
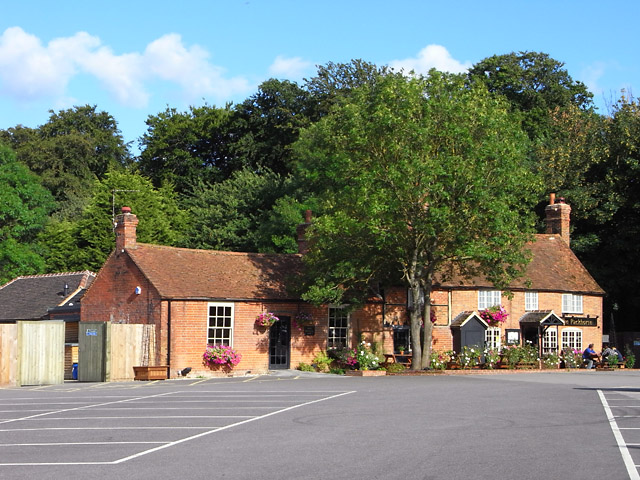
The Packhorse pub

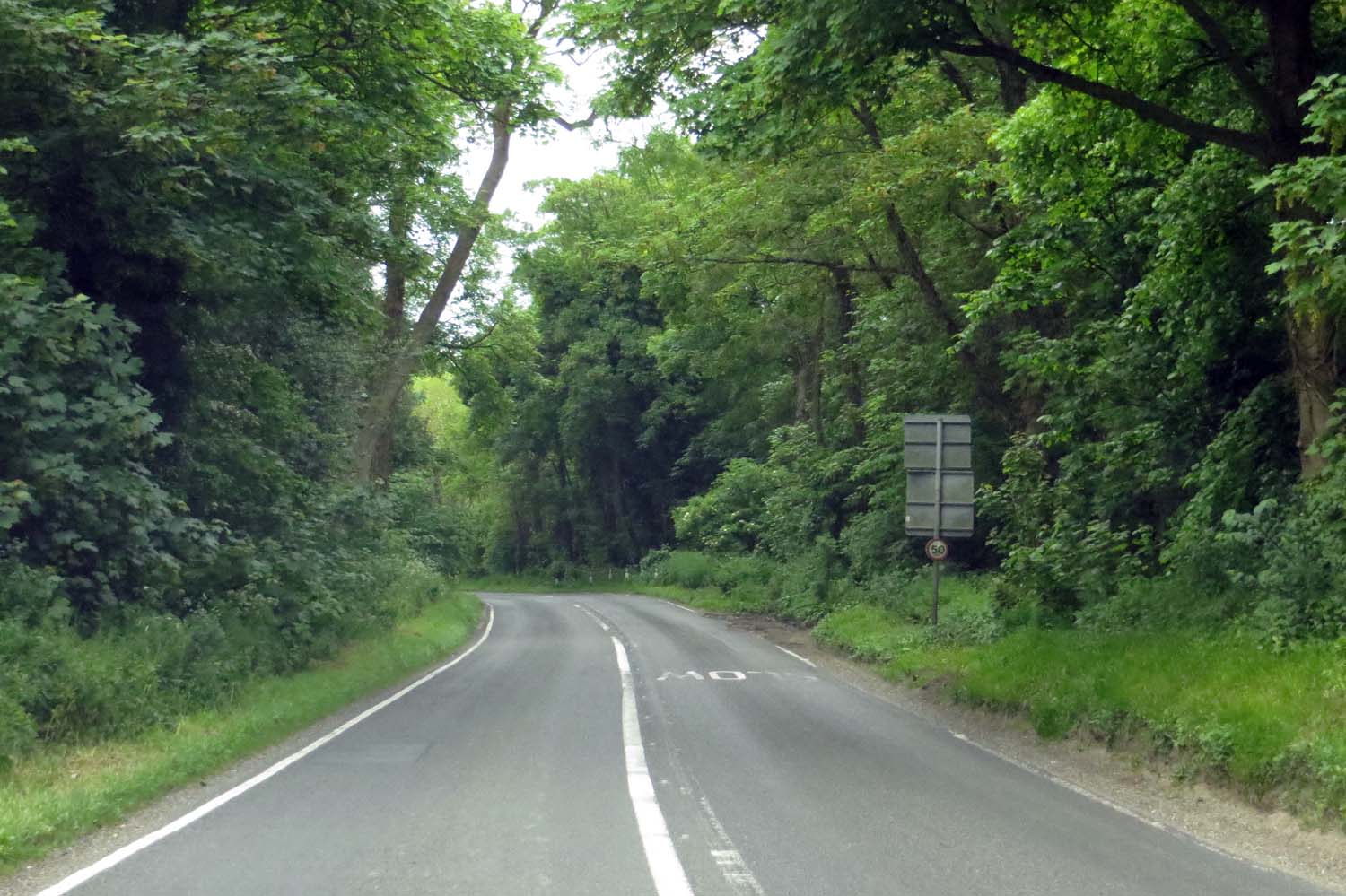
The A4074

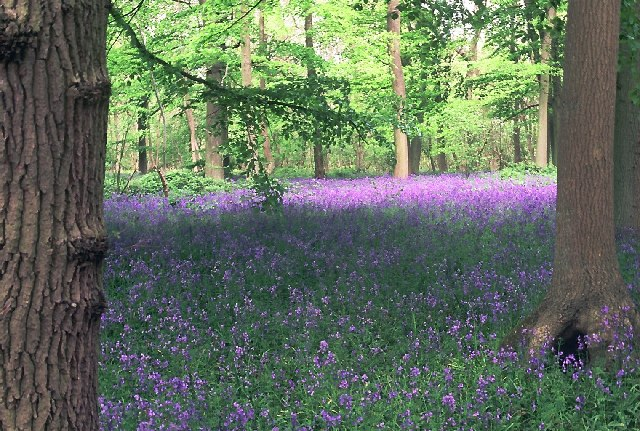
Page's Shaw wood
