= Mapledurham Lock =

Lock and weir on the River Thames in Berkshire, England

Coordinates: 51.48623°N 1.04078°W

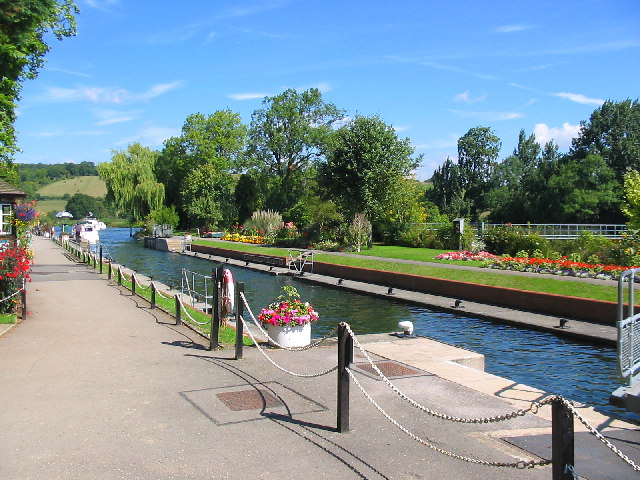
- Mapledurham Lock on a fine August day
- Waterway: River Thames
- County: Berkshire
- Maintained by: Environment Agency
- Operation: Hydraulic
- First built: 1777
- Latest built: 1908
- Length: 61.69 m (202 ft 5 in)
- Width: 6.42 m (21 ft 1 in)
- Fall: 2.05 m (6 ft 9 in)
- Above sea level: 127 ft (39 m)
- Distance to Teddington Lock: 59 miles

Mapledurham Lock is a lock and weir situated on the River Thames in England, about 4 miles upstream of Reading. The lock was first built in 1777 by the Thames Navigation Commissioners and the present lock dates from 1908.

Despite its name, the lock is located in the Berkshire village and civil parish of Purley-On-Thames on the south bank of the river, rather than in the Oxfordshire village of Mapledurham on the other side of the river. The lock is accessible from Purley village down Mapledurham Drive, a metalled lane that turns to gravel. The weir stretches across the river, in both counties.

The weir runs from the lock island in a long curve across the river between the two villages. However no access is possible across the weir, and without a boat, journeys between the two villages require a lengthy detour via Reading or Pangbourne. The weir still provides a head of water to drive Mapledurham Watermill which is on the opposite side of the river. The weir is also the furthest upstream on the Thames that has a salmon ladder.

== History ==
Mapledurham mill dates back to Domesday Book, and the weir was probably connected to it then, although the earliest extant reference to the weir is from the time of Edward I. The mill was attached to the property of Mapledurham House, owned by the Blount family, who have always had an interest in the weir. They were required to maintain the weir, under an agreement dating from before the Magna Carta of 1215. There was a flash lock at the weir but passage through this was stopped at the opening of the pound lock in 1777. The Thames Commissioners began a series of improvements to the river around that time, and the residents of the district asked them to fund improvements to Mapledurham weir in 1776. Although there was a lack of funds, they agreed to pay for a new lock, which was completed in the summer of 1777. The lock was built of fir on the Purley side of the river and was to be called Purley Lock. However local custom retained the old name. A cottage was ordered for the lock-keeper in 1816. During the 19th century there were disputes between the lock-keeper William Sheppard and the Blount family. However despite Blount's representations to the Conservators, Sheppard remained in post for 54 years, retiring at the age of 79. A new and greatly enlarged lock was built beside the old one in 1908. This became the first of the Thames locks to be mechanised, when it was automated in 1956.

Mapledurham Mill is still functioning across the river from the lock, making this the only lock and weir combination on the Thames that supports the two functions that were originally the norm on river navigations. As both mill and navigation are now principally tourist enterprises, this no longer leads to the sort of conflicts between milling and navigation interests that were once common on the river.

== Reach above the lock ==
The river is in open country nearly all the way to Pangbourne and has been described by Robert Gibbings writing in 1939 (Sweet Thames Run Softly) as so crowded with views "they might have dropped from the gold frames of the Royal Academy".

After Mapledurham, Hardwick House is visible on the northern side of the river. Pangbourne Meadows, owned by the National Trust, lie to the south of the river before Whitchurch Bridge. This toll bridge crosses the river between Pangbourne and Whitchurch. Between the bridge and Whitchurch Lock, the River Pang joins the Thames from the south.

The Thames Path follows the southern bank to Whitchurch Bridge, where it crosses the river. (Although this is a toll bridge, pedestrians are no longer charged).

The artist E. H. Shepherd who illustrated The Wind in the Willows made many drawings in this area, and Toad Hall is said to be based on either Mapledurham House or Hardwick House, home of Charles Day Rose, nearby.

== Gallery ==
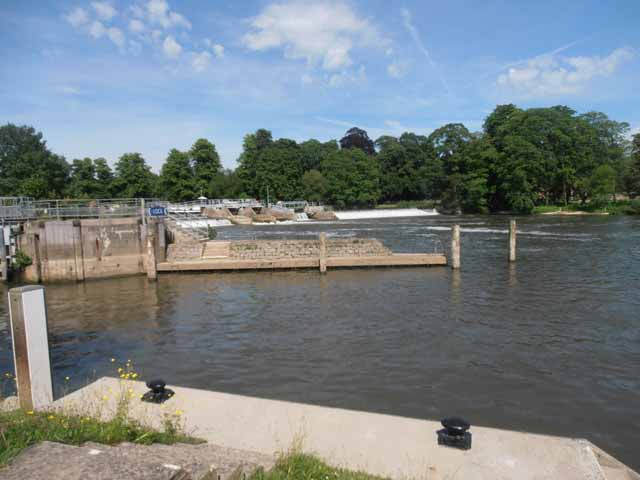
The lock and weir spanning the river

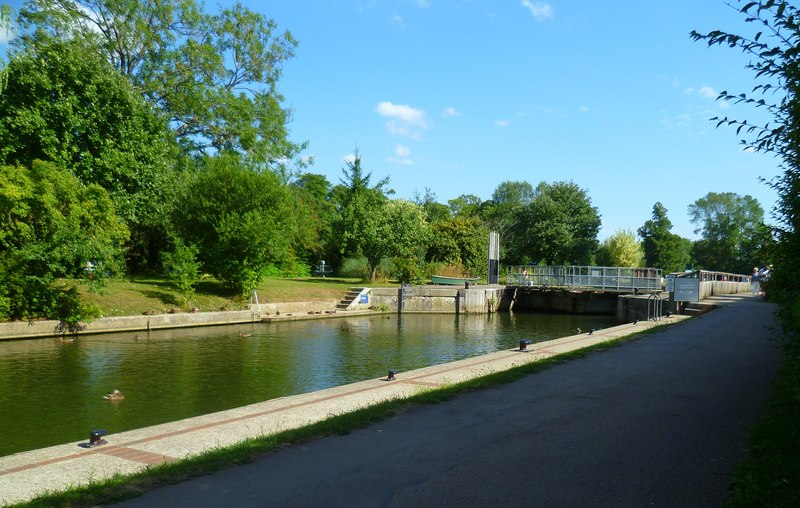
The lock chamber

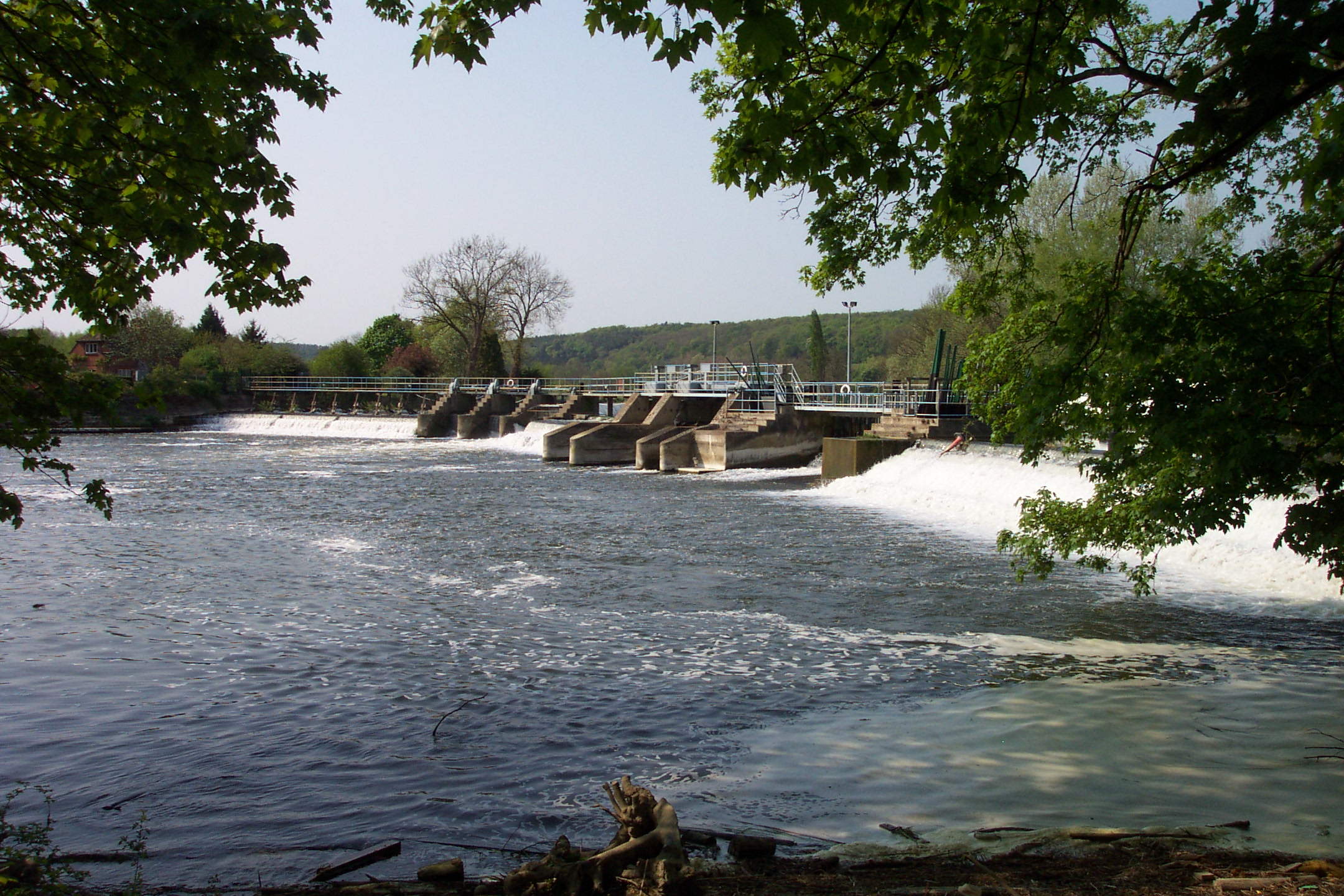
The weir, viewed from the Mapledurham side of the river

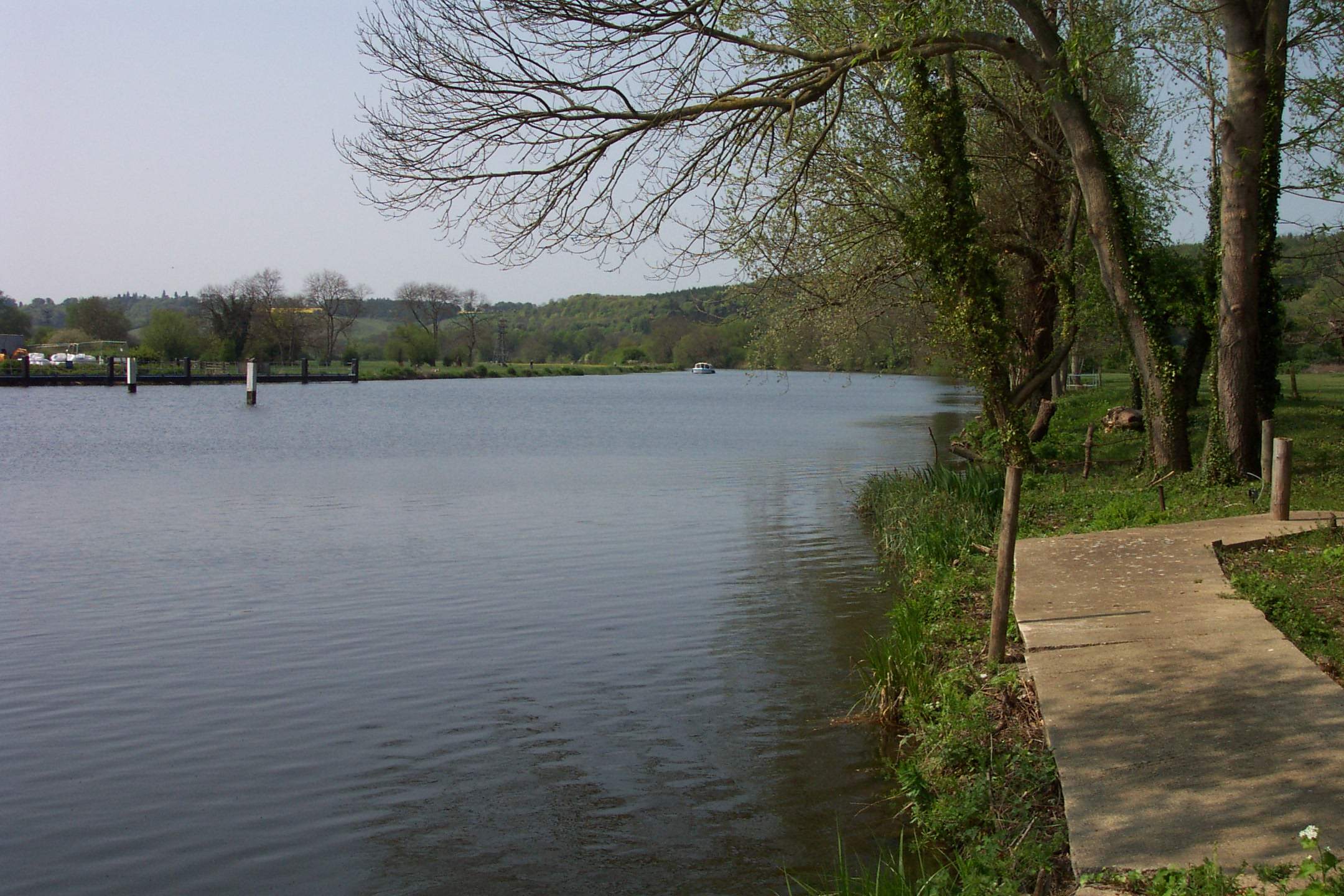
The River Thames above Mapledurham Lock

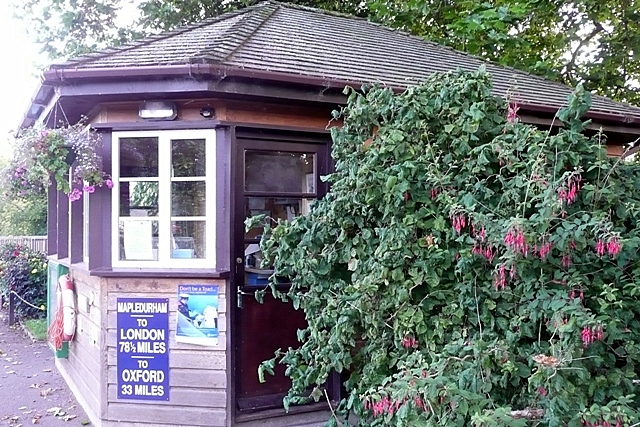
The Lock-keeper's cabin

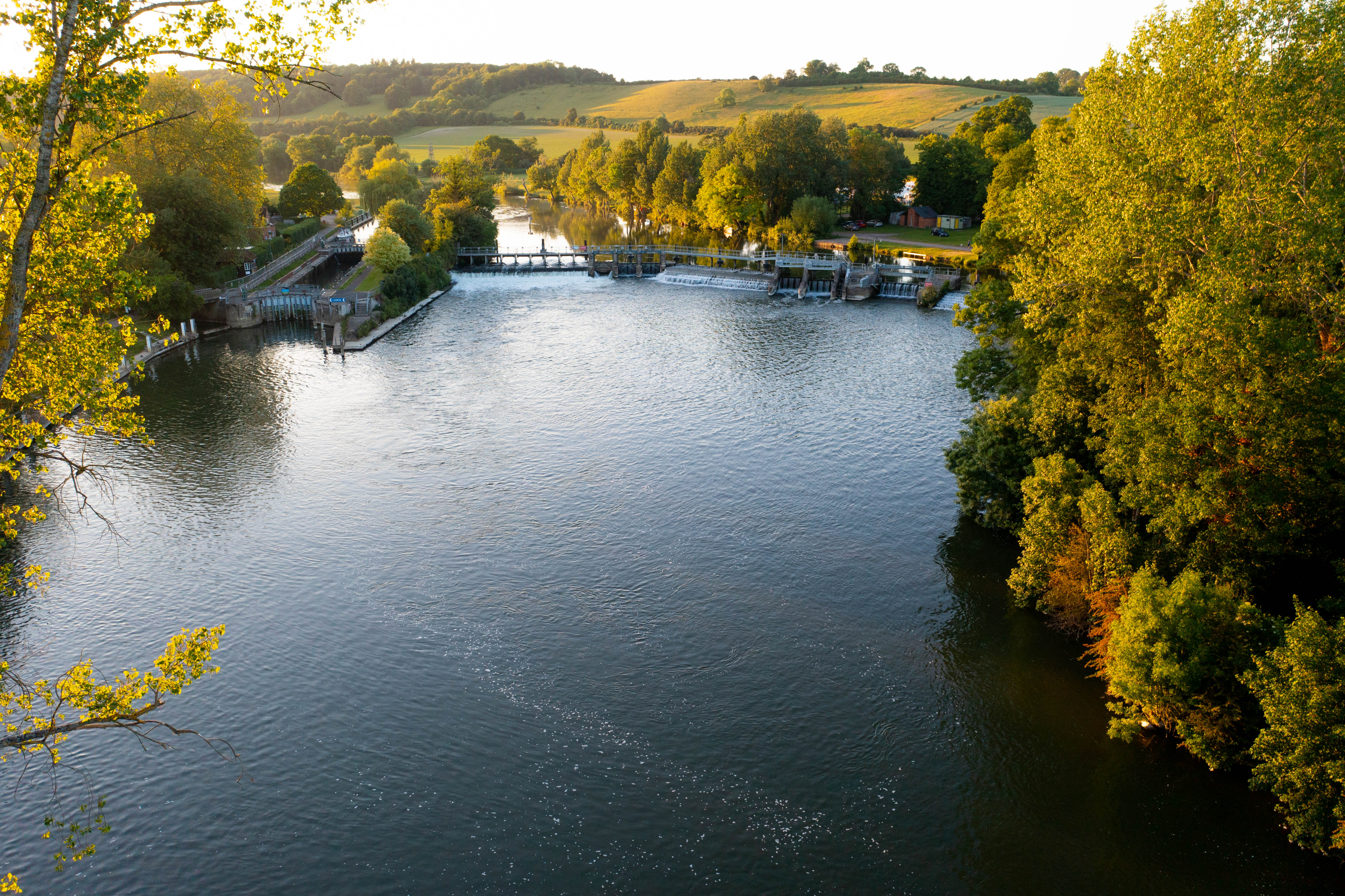
Aerial view of Mapledurham lock and weir

== See also ==
- Locks on the River Thames

Next lock upstream	River Thames	Next lock downstream
Whitchurch Lock; 3.67 km (2.28 mi)	Mapledurham Lock; Grid reference: SU667768	Caversham Lock; 7.08 km (4.40 mi)

== Bibliography ==
- Environment Agency, A User's Guide to the River Thames:Part II (PDF), Environment Agency, archived from the original (PDF) on 30 November 2010
- Nicholson (2006). Nicholson Guides Vol 7: River Thames & the southern waterways. Harper Collins. ISBN 978-0-00-721115-9.
- Thacker, Fred S. (1968) [1920], The Thames Highway: A History of the Locks and Weirs, Kew: David & Charles, ISBN 978-0-7153-4233-6
