= Mapledurham Watermill =

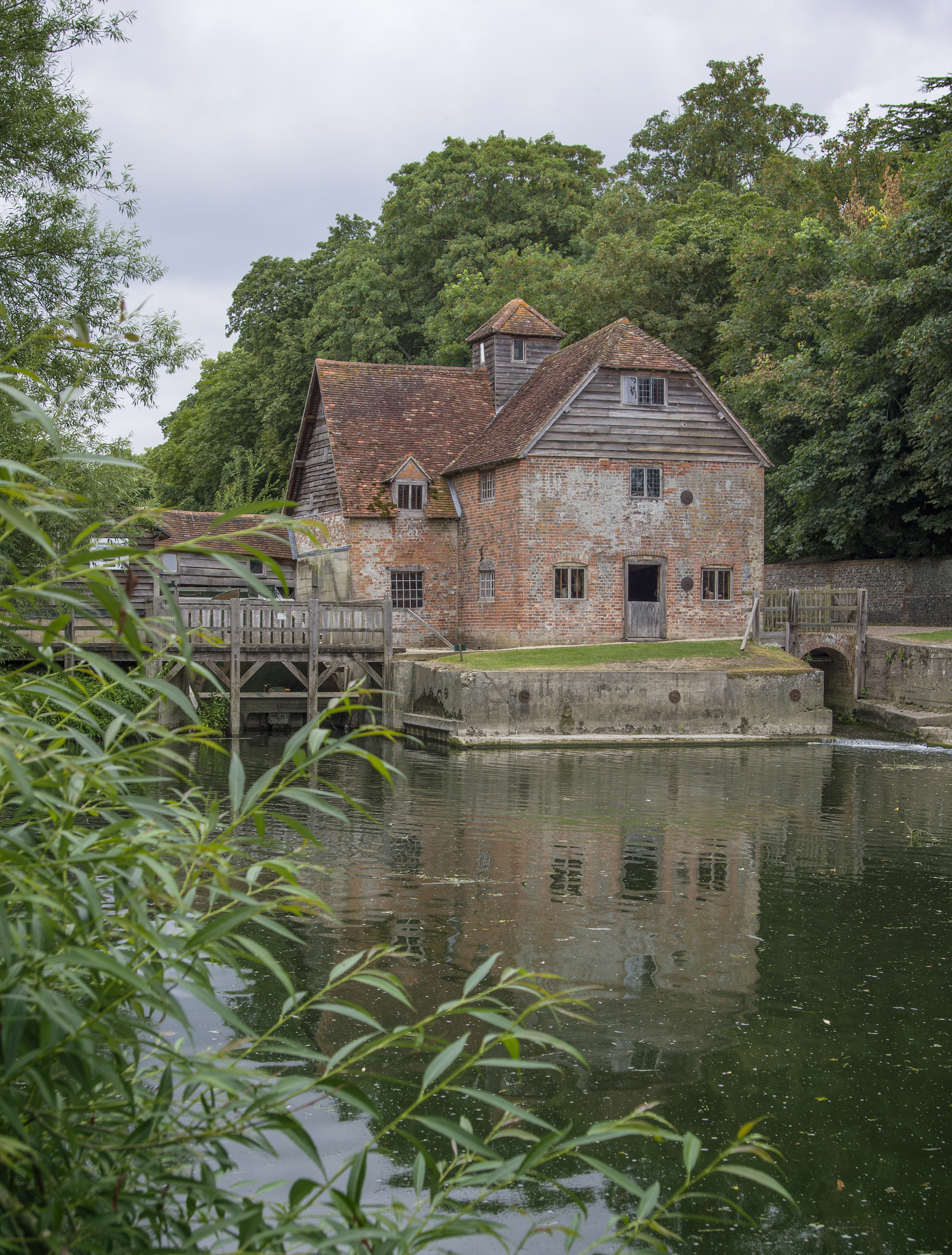

- Location within Oxfordshire
- 51°29′8.52″N 1°2′14.82″W
- Location: Mapledurham, Oxfordshire, England

History
- Built: 15th to 19th century

Site notes
- Governing body: Mapledurham Estate

Listed Building – Grade II*
- Official name: The Mill
- Designated: 24 October 1951
- Reference no.: 1059523

Mapledurham Watermill is a historic watermill in the civil parish of Mapledurham in the English county of Oxfordshire. It is driven by the head of water created by Mapledurham Lock and Weir, on the River Thames. The mill was built in the 15th century, and further extended in the 17th, 18th and 19th centuries. It is a Grade II* listed building and is preserved in an operational state.

The mill also houses a micro hydro-electric power station, using a 3.6-metre (12 ft) Archimedes' screw turbine to generate electricity for sale to the National Grid. The turbine produces some 83.3 kilowatts, which is sufficient to power about 140 homes.

== History ==
A mill was already present at Mapledurham at the time of the Domesday Book. The central section of the current mill building dates back to the 15th century. Originally the mill had a single water wheel on the river side of the building. The mill was increased in size in the 1670s, and a leat was constructed to drive a second water wheel on the village side. It is this second wheel which is still in use today.

In 1690, the mill was leased to James Web for the sum of £60 per year. Around 1700, he expanded the mill again to allow him to install the equipment to produce the refined flour that was becoming popular. His son Daniel Webb took over from him in 1726 at a rent of £100. In 1747, Thomas Atrum took over the mill at a rent of £150, which was raised to £205 in 1776. In 1777 a barn was added on the mill island, and a wharf built to allow the mill to supply flour to the London market by barge. However, by 1784 Thomas Atrum was bankrupt.

The mill continued to flourish, and as late as 1823 plans were drawn up to rebuild the mill in classical style. The advent of cheap imported flour from North America damaged the mill's prosperity, but it remained in use until just after the Second World War. On 24 October 1951, the watermill was designated as a Grade II* listed building. It was restored and brought back into use in 1980.

In 2011, work started on the installation of a new Archimedes' screw turbine on the river side of the watermill in order to generate electricity. This was built to provide power to Mapledurham House, and replaced a turbine installed in the 1920s that was no longer functional. At the time the turbine was inaugurated in 2012, it was the most powerful turbine on the River Thames, and the largest of its type in the country.

In 2022, the mill was vandalised with windows smashed and damage to wooden frames.

== Admission and access ==
In 2025, the mill could be visited as part of a pre-booked tour including Mapledurham House and gardens on 11 Wednesday afternoons between April and October.

The mill is located in the grounds of Mapledurham House. The water mill is normally working on opening days, and visitors can visit both main floors of the mill, and see (and feel) its operation.

Admission is charged, and joint tickets are available that allow admission to both house and mill. Access is by car down the narrow and steep lane that is Mapledurham village's only road connection, or by a boat service that runs from Thameside Promenade in Reading on all opening days.

== In media ==
The mill building is best known, and has gained worldwide recognition, for being featured on the cover of heavy metal band Black Sabbath's self-titled debut album in 1970.

The watermill is also known for its starring role in the 1976 film of The Eagle Has Landed, where the mill leat is the scene of the dramatic rescue of a local girl by a German paratrooper that results in the unmasking of Steiner and his men.

The mill was used as a filming location on the Children's Film Foundation's Exploits at West Poley (1985), starring Jonathan Jackson, Charlie Condou, Brenda Fricker and Sean Bean.

The mill appears in the introductory credits to the BBC television programme, Richard Hammond's Blast Lab, as the supposed hidden location of the underground lab. The mill also appears in the Midsomer Murders episodes "The Fisher King" (season 7; episode 3), as the scene for the discovery of a body, and "A Grain of Truth" (season 23; episode 3). The mill is also the location used for Mill Cottage in the Inspector Morse episode "The Day of The Devil".

The mill appears as a location in several episodes of the 2017 BBC series Taboo starring Tom Hardy.

In 2022, Mapledurham Mill appears as the backdrop for series 5, episode 4 of Mortimer & Whitehouse Gone Fishing. It is the location at which Bob and Paul embark on their boat trip to the weir for an (unsuccessful) fishing trip and subsequently return to, on both days 1 and 2, to fish.

The Millhouse is used as the Family Home to young Scrooge in a flashback to his childhood in the 2026 Ti West movie Ebenezer starring Johnny Depp.

== Gallery ==
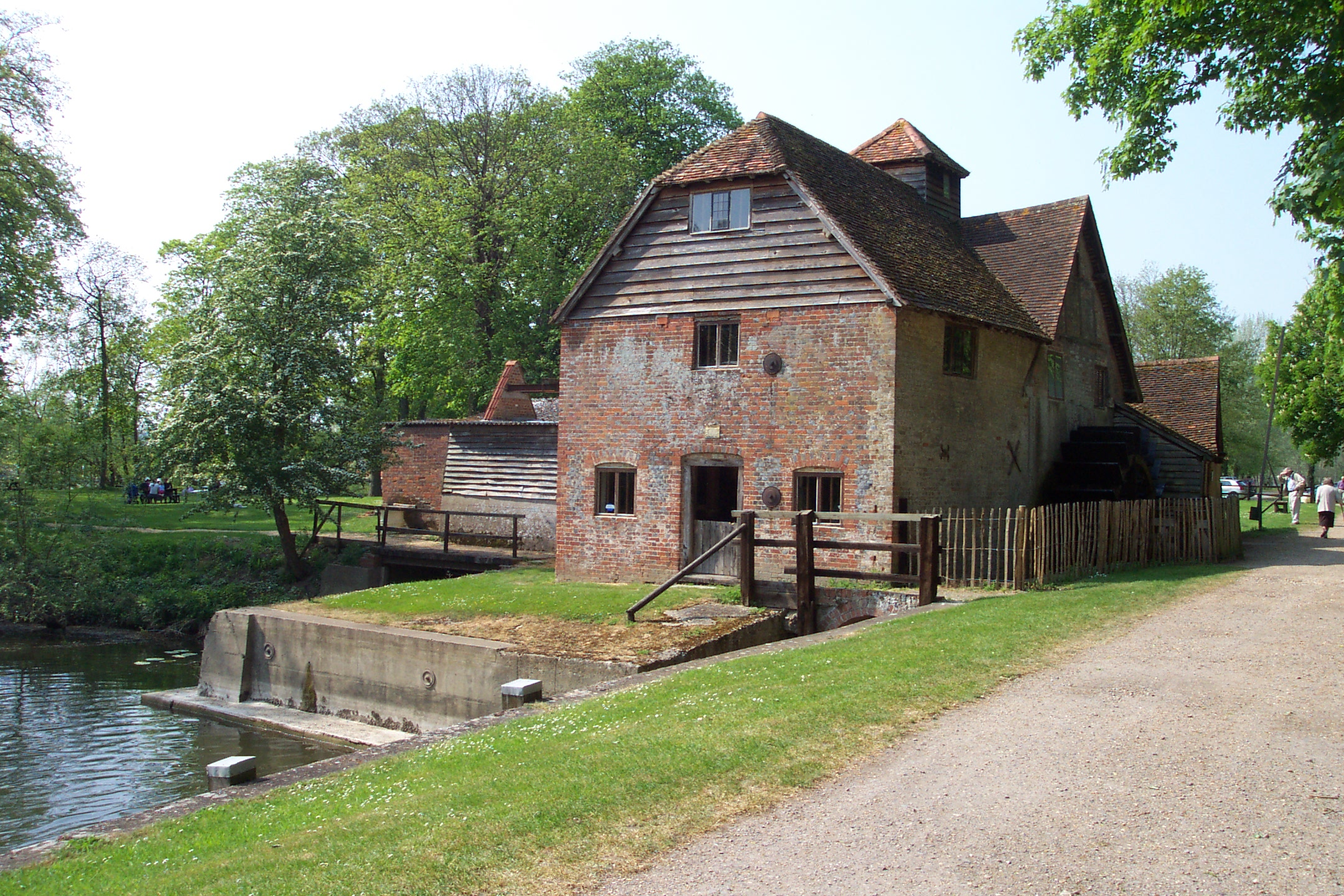
The watermill seen from the foot of the village street

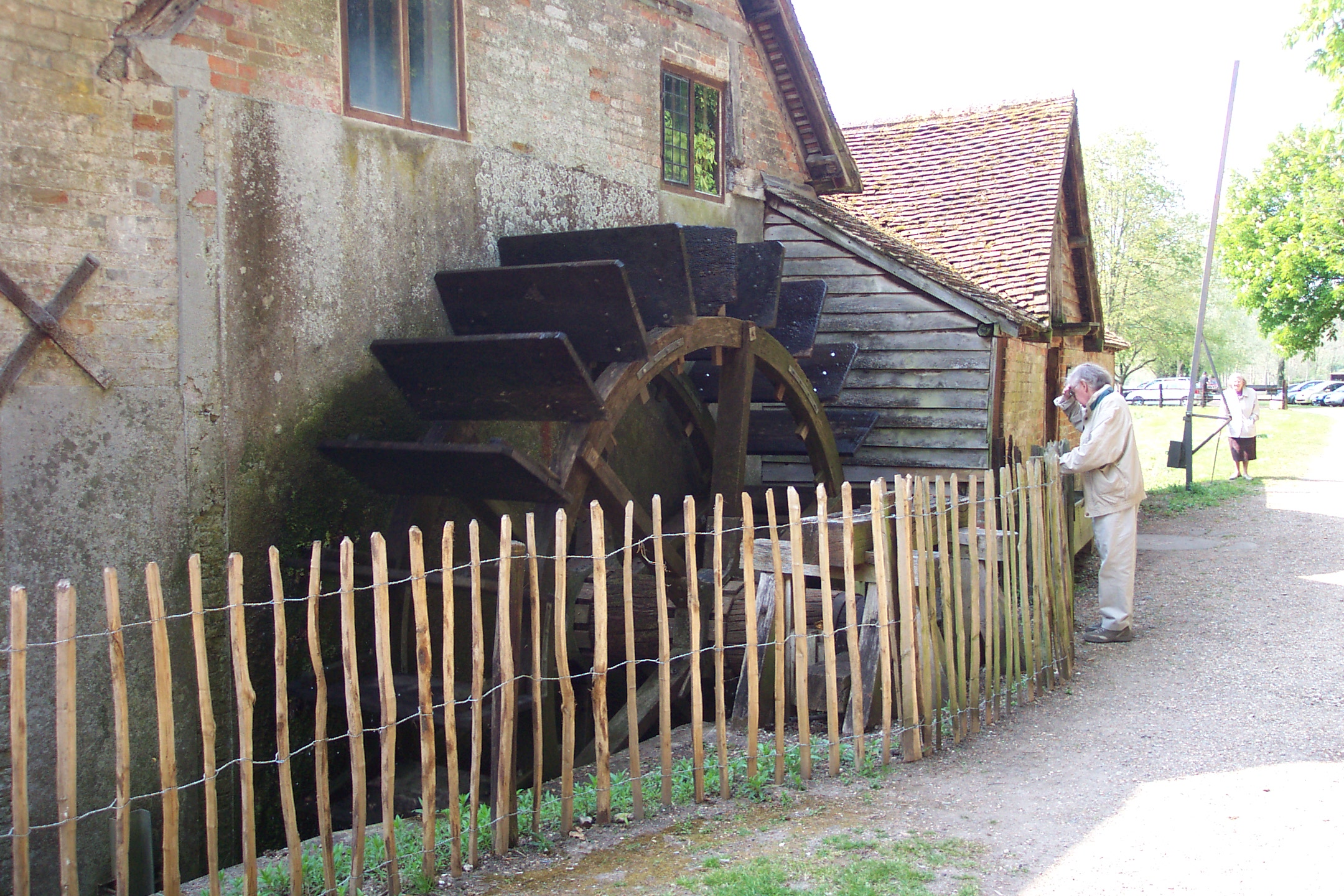
The water wheel

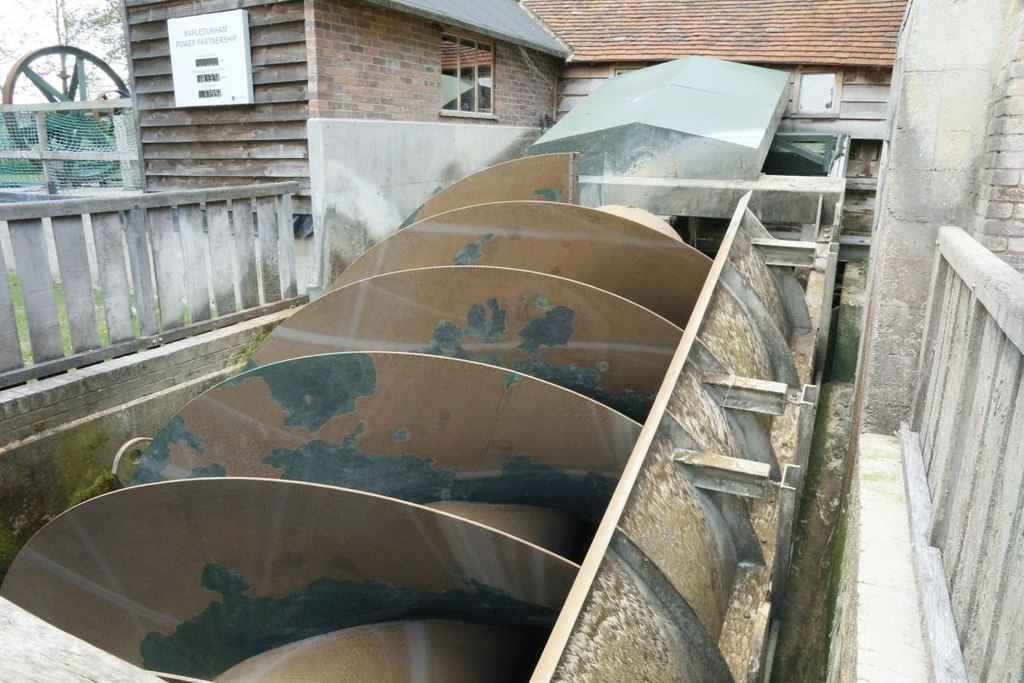
The Archimedes screw turbine

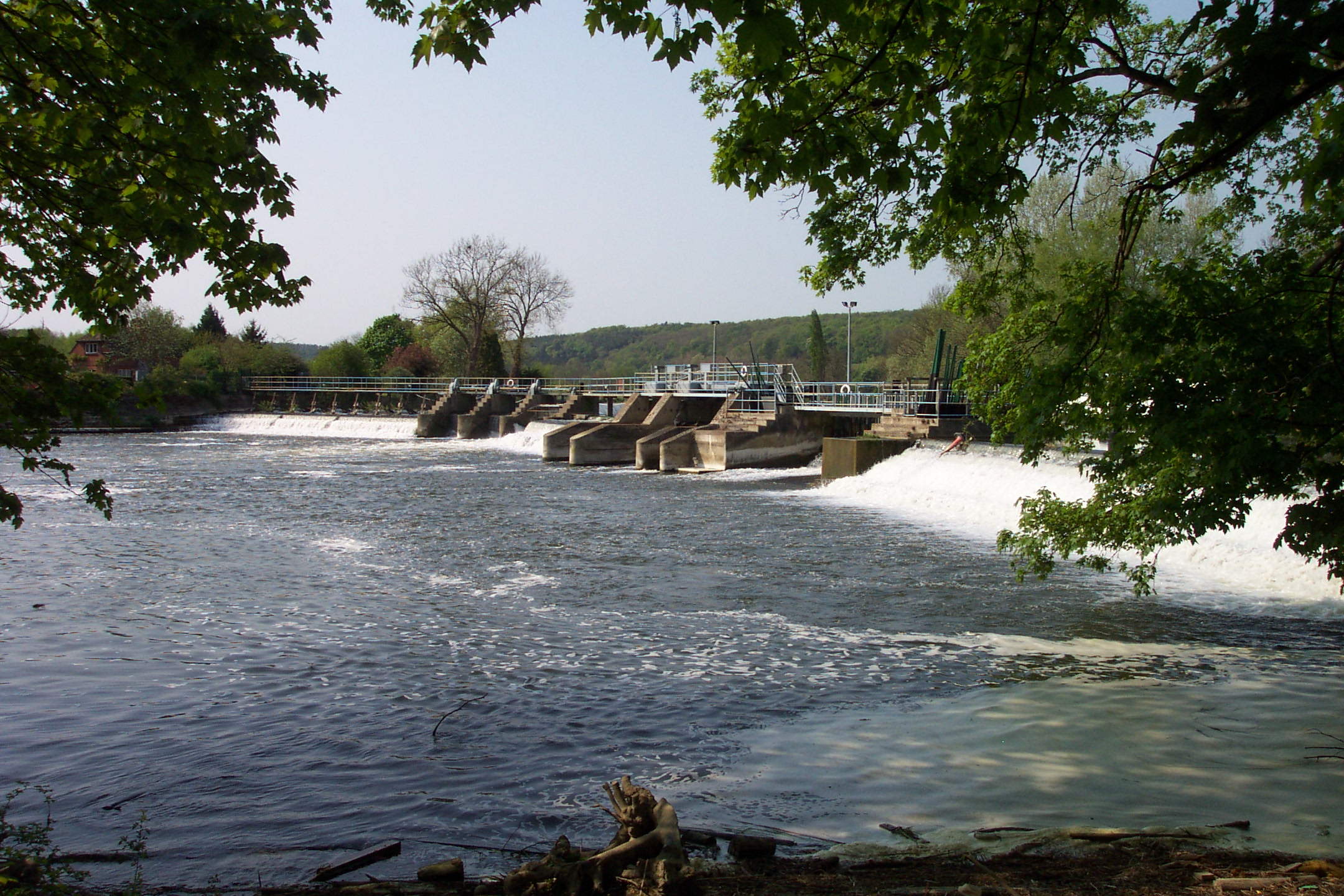
The weir that provides the driving force

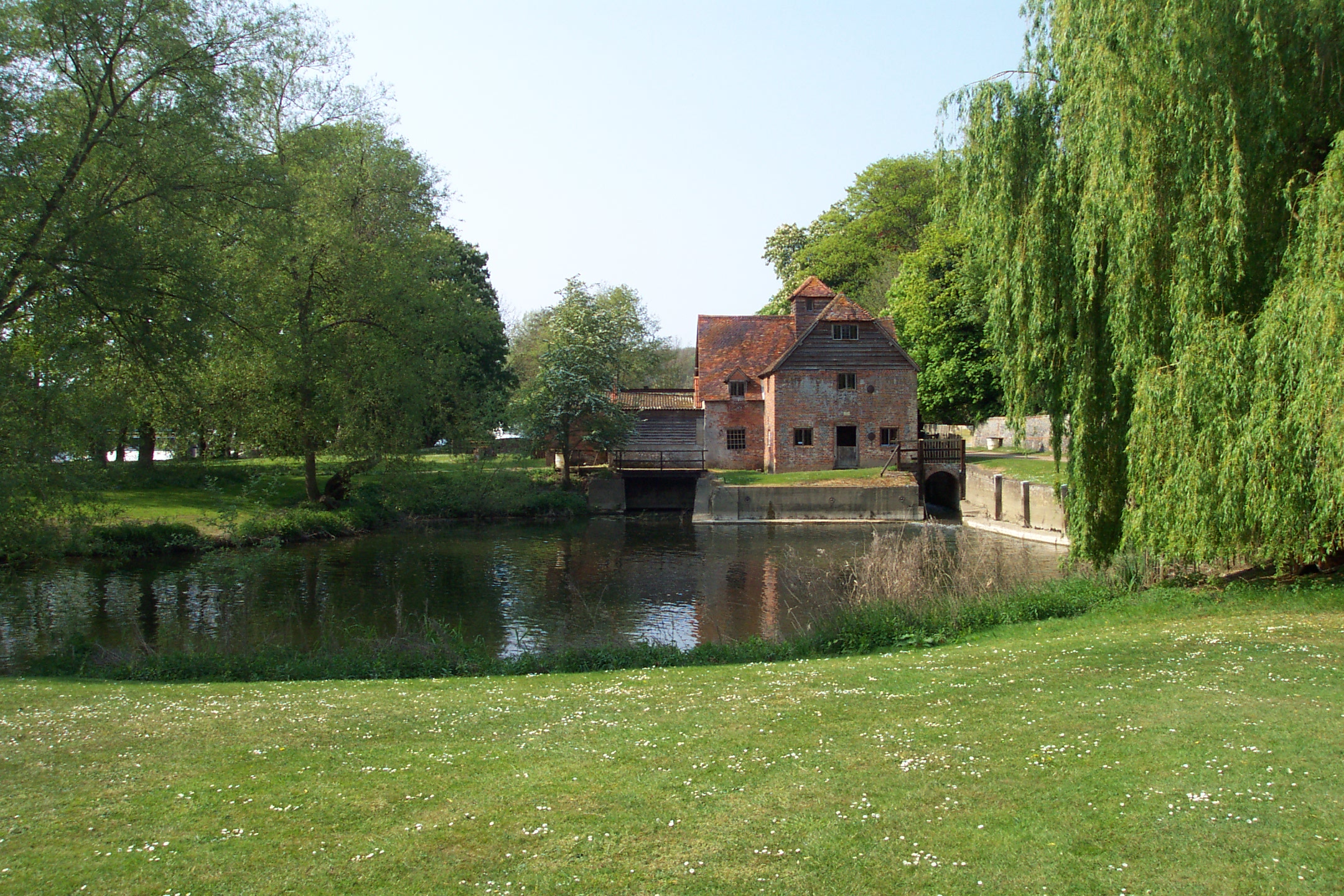
The watermill seen from the lawns of the house

== See also ==
- List of watermills in the United Kingdom
- Museum of Oxford
