= Richard Hammond's Blast Lab =

British children's game show

- Genre: Children
- Presented by: Richard Hammond
- Country of origin: United Kingdom
- Original language: English
- No. of series: 4
- No. of episodes: 52

Production
- Running time: 30 minutes
- Production company: September Films

Original release
- Network: BBC Two (3 January – 12 September 2009); CBBC Channel (14 July – 7 October 2010); BBC One (14 July – 6 October 2011)
- Release: 3 January 2009 – 6 October 2011

Richard Hammond's Blast Lab is a children's game show that aired from 3 January 2009 to 6 October 2011, first on BBC Two, then on CBBC Channel and then on BBC One. It was hosted by Richard Hammond.

The programme involves two teams of three children – referred to as the Red Team and the Yellow Team – taking part in science-related challenges to win prizes at the end of the show. The prizes for the winning team are announced, as well as the losing team, and would blow up the losing teams prizes. Hammond has taken an approach that has come from years of working on Top Gear with elements of Brainiac: Science Abuse. The show also features Hammond's prized 1963 Opel Kadett car named "Oliver", which he acquired for the Top Gear: Botswana Special. Hammond's "Ninja Nan", who acts as security at the Blast Lab (and who never speaks), is introduced at the start of each episode as substitute for SAS guards who, for a different reason in each episode, are absent. Ninja Nan also displays the prizes the winning team will be taking home with them, as well as those the losing team would have won, after the final challenge, which is called the 'Messy Messy Mess Test' and involves both teams and a large tank of gunge.

Loyal, yet incompetent servant-like men which Hammond refers to as "Lab Rats" also appear in every episode. Lab Rats, who wear lab coats that have one half red and the other half yellow, are always seen taking on dangerous stunts and moaning around the lab. According to the introductory credits, the secret lab is supposed to be located beneath Mapledurham Watermill in Oxfordshire. In episode 7, the bias against caravans, which is often brought up in Top Gear and in Brainiac, continues, with one being wrecked by a fiery catapult.

"Mini-Miss", a bespectacled young girl of around ten years old who wears a lab coat like those sported by the Lab Rats, appears in the 'Mini-Science with Mini-Miss' round. Hammond explains to the audience that Mini-Miss is actually his old science teacher whom he attempted to bring back through time with his home-made time machine, but something went wrong and she arrived as a child when she was a 65 year old adult. Despite having been regressed to a youngster, Mini-Miss is shown to not suffer fools gladly, particularly Hammond, whom she always chides for some misdemeanor or other reasons; such as not paying attention, for example – she goes to give the teams advice prior to the start of the round.
