= Whitchurch Hill =

Village in Oxfordshire, England

Coordinates: 51.510°N 1.076°W

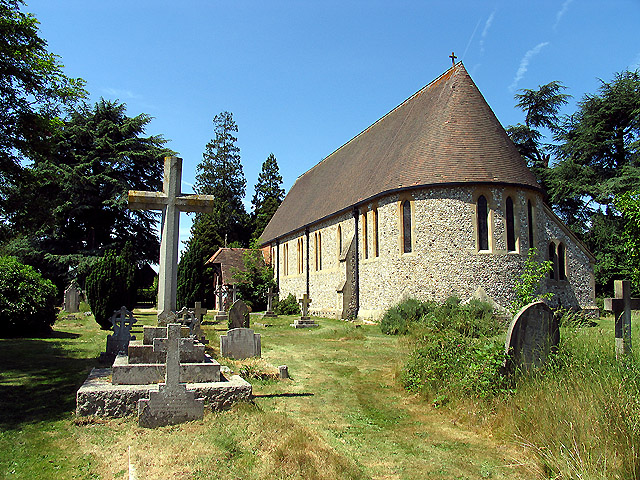
- St. John the Baptist parish church

- Location within Oxfordshire
- OS grid reference: SU6479
- Civil parish: Goring Heath
- District: South Oxfordshire
- Shire county: Oxfordshire
- Region: South East
- Country: England
- Sovereign state: United Kingdom
- Post town: Reading
- Postcode district: RG8
- Dialling code: 0118
- Police: Thames Valley
- Fire: Oxfordshire
- Ambulance: South Central
- UK Parliament: Henley
- Website: Goring Heath community website

Whitchurch Hill is a village in the Chiltern Hills in Oxfordshire, about 5.5 miles (9 km) northwest of Reading, Berkshire, near Whitchurch-on-Thames. The Church of England parish church of Saint John the Baptist was designed by the architect Francis Bacon (1842–1930) and built in 1883. Whitchurch Hill has a public house, the Sun Inn.

== Sources ==
- Sherwood, Jennifer; Pevsner, Nikolaus (1974). Oxfordshire. The Buildings of England. Harmondsworth: Penguin. p. 839. ISBN 0-14-071045-0.
