= Crays Pond =

Hamlet in Oxfordshire, England

Coordinates: 51.520437°N 1.083142°W

- Location within Oxfordshire
- OS grid reference: SU 63688 80576
- Civil parish: Goring Heath
- District: South Oxfordshire
- Shire county: Oxfordshire
- Region: South East
- Country: England
- Sovereign state: United Kingdom
- Postcode district: RG8
- Police: Thames Valley
- Fire: Oxfordshire
- Ambulance: South Central

Crays Pond is a hamlet situated in the parish of Goring Heath in South Oxfordshire. Crays Pond is about 2.4 miles (3.9 km) northeast of Goring-on-Thames and about 7.0 miles (11.3 km) northwest of Reading, Berkshire.

== Notable residents ==
Notable residents of Crays Pond include the Russian ballet dancers Rudolf Nureyev and Mikhail Baryshnikov who both lived in the same Russian-owned safe house at different times.

In 2016 Crays Pond 71-year old resident Doreen Pechey became the oldest person in Britain to pass the Royal Academy of Dance's grade 6 ballet exam and was dubbed "Britain's oldest ballerina".
