= Mapledurham =

Coordinates: 51°29′06″N 1°02′17″W

- Village and civil parish
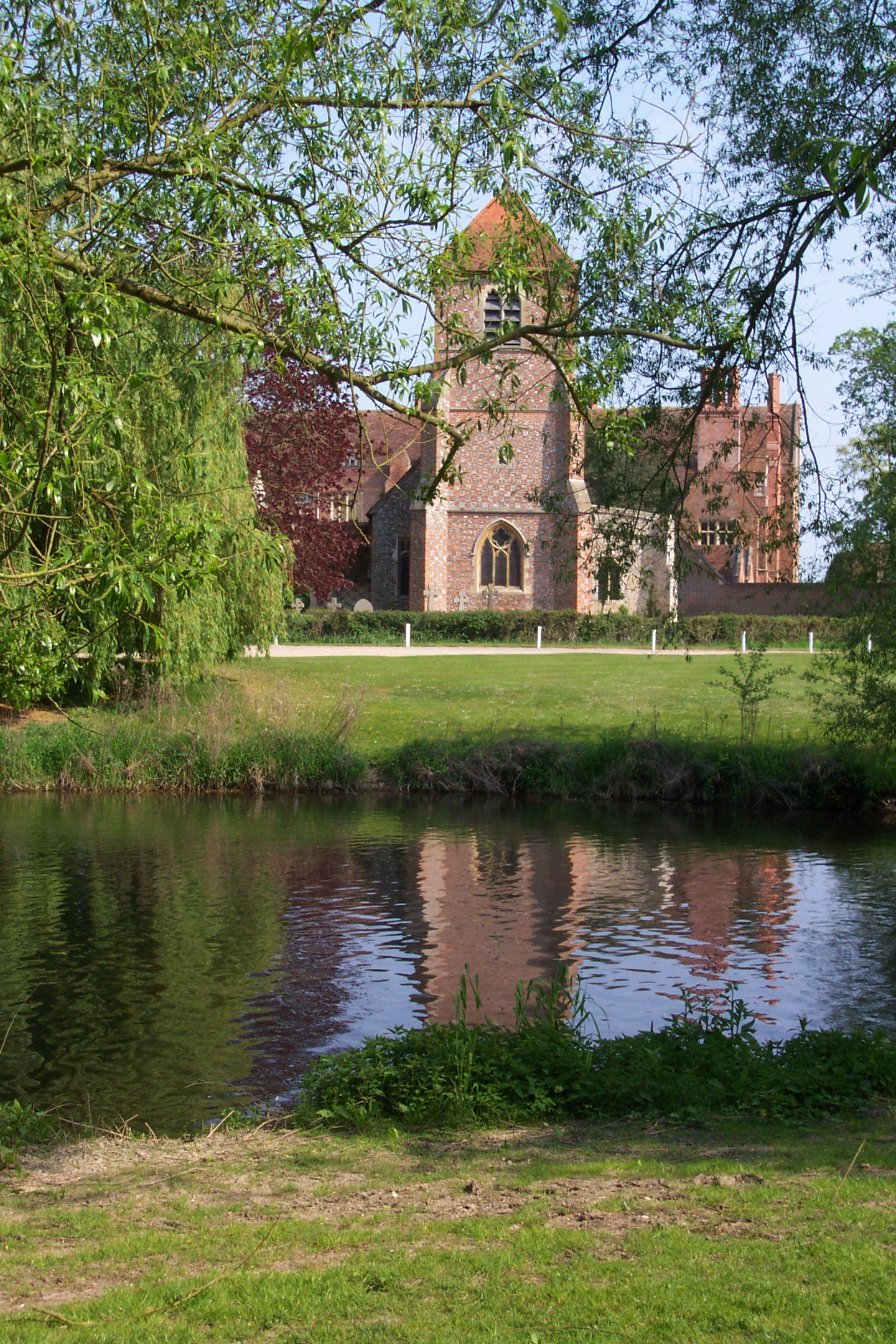
- Mapledurham Church and House, seen from the Watermill

- Location within Oxfordshire
- Area: 11.32 km^{2} (4.37 sq mi)
- Population: 317 (2011 census)
  - Density: 28/km^{2} (73/sq mi)
- OS grid reference: SU6776
- Civil parish: Mapledurham
- District: South Oxfordshire
- Shire county: Oxfordshire
- Region: South East
- Country: England
- Sovereign state: United Kingdom
- Post town: Reading
- Postcode district: RG4
- Dialling code: 01491
- Police: Thames Valley
- Fire: Oxfordshire
- Ambulance: South Central
- UK Parliament: Henley and Thame

Mapledurham is a small village, civil parish and country estate beside the River Thames in southern Oxfordshire, England. The parish borders Caversham, the most northerly district of Reading, Berkshire. Historic buildings in the area include the Church of England parish church of St. Margaret, Mapledurham Watermill and Mapledurham House.

== Village ==
The village is on the north bank of the River Thames about 3.5 miles (5.6 km) northwest of Reading. Road access is by a narrow and steep lane from Trench Green on the rural road from Caversham to Goring Heath, Goring-on-Thames and other places. The village is closer geodesically (as the crow flies) to Reading's centre than some parts of its districts but it is highly conserved, traffic-calm and rural.

The access lane becomes the main street of the village and terminates on the bank of the River Thames, where it is surrounded by a cluster of three significant buildings. The Church of England parish church of St. Margaret was mainly built in the 14th and 15th century, and was restored in 1863 by the Gothic Revival architect William Butterfield. Mapledurham Watermill dates from the 16th and 17th century and is the last operational watermill on the River Thames. Mapledurham House, the country house that is the headquarters of the Mapledurham estate, is one of the largest Elizabethan houses in Oxfordshire. On the village street inland from these three buildings can be found the Mapledurham Almshouses, a group of six almshouses built as a memorial to Sir Charles Lister who died in 1613, and now converted into two cottages.

Mapledurham Lock is on the opposite bank of the river, by the Berkshire village of Purley-on-Thames. Although the weir stretches across the river between the two villages, no access is possible across it and, in the absence of a boat, journeys between the two villages require a lengthy detour via Caversham or Whitchurch-on-Thames. Because of its scenic location, and lack of through traffic, Mapledurham has been used as a set for several films, including the 1976 thriller The Eagle Has Landed. The village, house and mill are a tourist attraction, and on summer weekends a large tour boat runs from Reading. The mill location is used on the cover of English rock band Black Sabbath's self-titled debut album Black Sabbath. In book 2 of The Forsyte Saga by John Galsworthy, In Chancery, Mapledurham is the location for Soames Forsyte's house.

== Civil parish ==
The civil parish of Mapledurham covers a considerably larger area than the village itself, and includes the even smaller settlements of Trench Green and Chazey Heath in the Chiltern Hills above the village. It is bordered to the west by the parishes of Whitchurch-on-Thames and Goring Heath, to the north by the parish of Kidmore End, to the east by the Reading suburb of Caversham, and to the south by the River Thames.

In the 2011 census, Mapledurham civil parish had a population of 317, an increase of 37 over the previous census in 2001. For local government purposes the civil parish forms part of the district of South Oxfordshire within the county of Oxfordshire. It is in the Henley constituency of the United Kingdom Parliament. The former Mapledurham ward of the Borough of Reading was adjacent to the parish.

== Estate ==
By the time of the Domesday Book, what is now the Mapledurham estate comprised two separate manors, Mapledurham Gurney and Mapledurham Chazey. Mapledurham Gurney was purchased by Richard Blount in 1490, and has remained in the ownership of his descendants ever since. Richard Blount's grandson, Sir Michael Blount, bought Mapledurham Chazey in 1582 and merged the two estates. Sir Michael was also responsible for the building of the current Mapledurham House on the site of the manor house of Mapledurham Gurney. The manorial seat of Mapledurham Chazey no longer exists, but is believed to have been on or near the site now occupied by Chazey Court Barn.

The Mapledurham estate owns much of the village and parish. It also includes the Mapledurham Watermill, a historic and still operational watermill on the River Thames, and Mapledurham House, an Elizabethan stately home. The estate currently belongs to the family of John "Jack" Eyston. At one time the estate included several farms, but farming has now been consolidated on a single farm. The estate has strongly diversified into leisure activities, and includes two golf courses and several holiday cottages. Additionally the house, watermill and surrounding grounds are opened to the public on weekend and bank holiday afternoons from April to September.

== Gallery ==
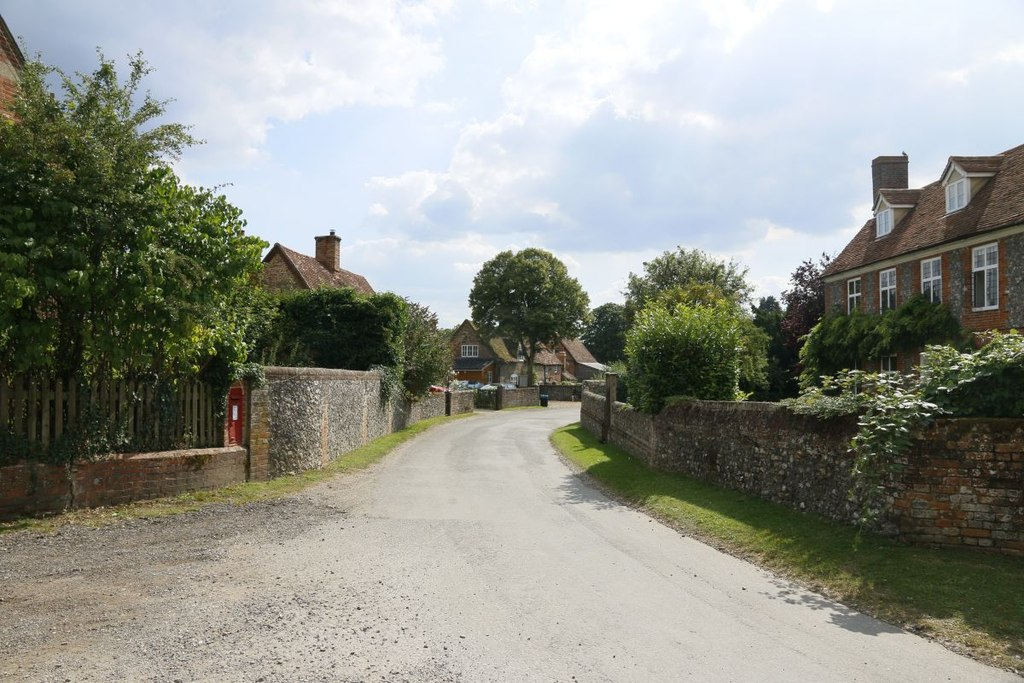
The entrance to the village heading towards the river

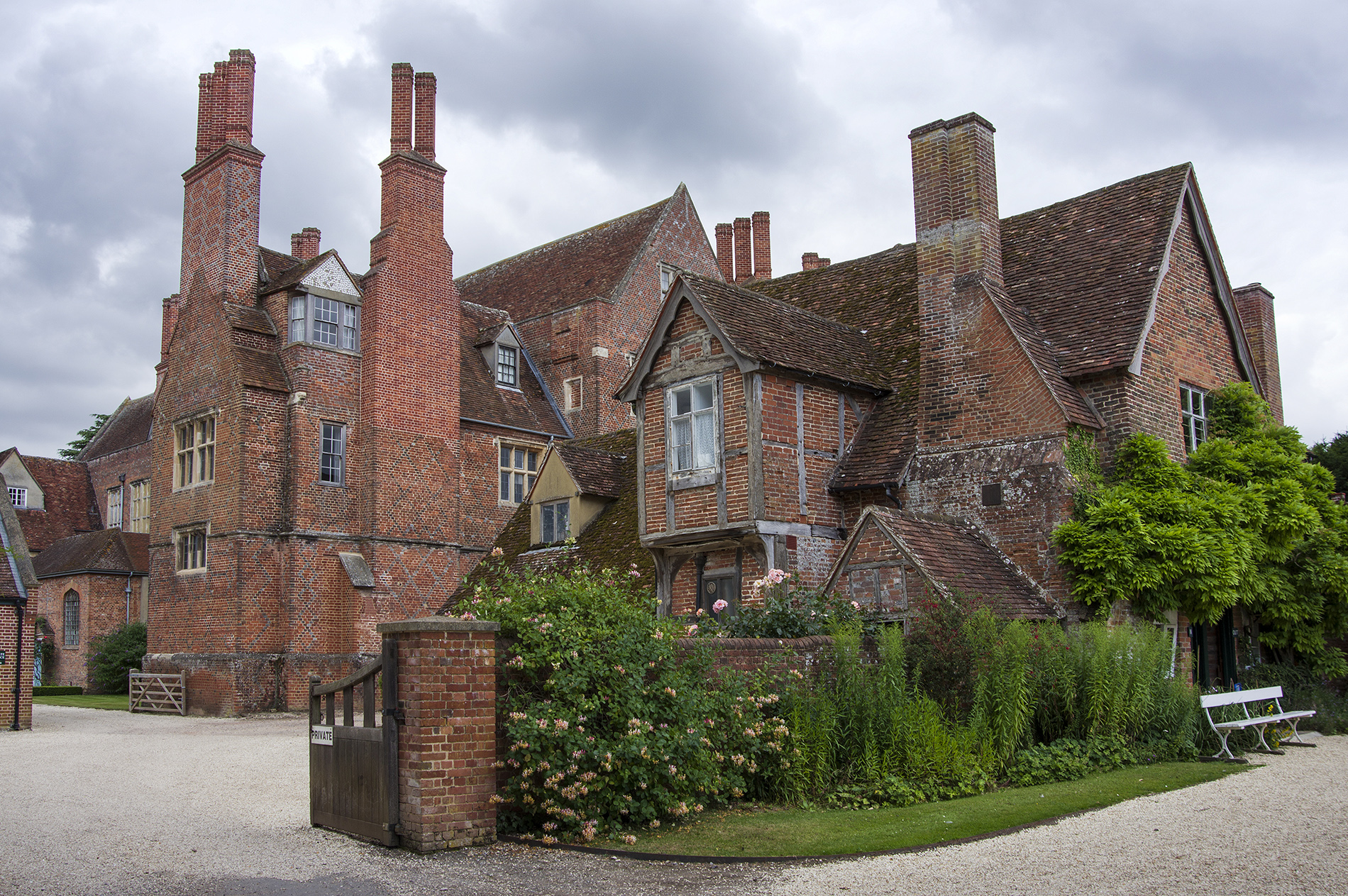
The old manor house with the Elizabethan Mapledurham House in the background

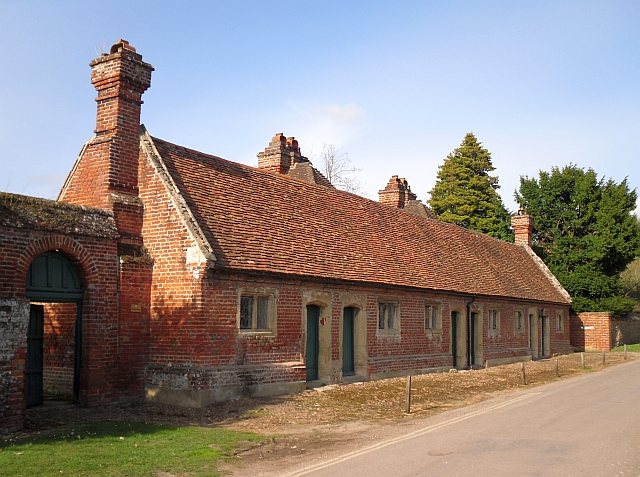
The Almshouses on the village street

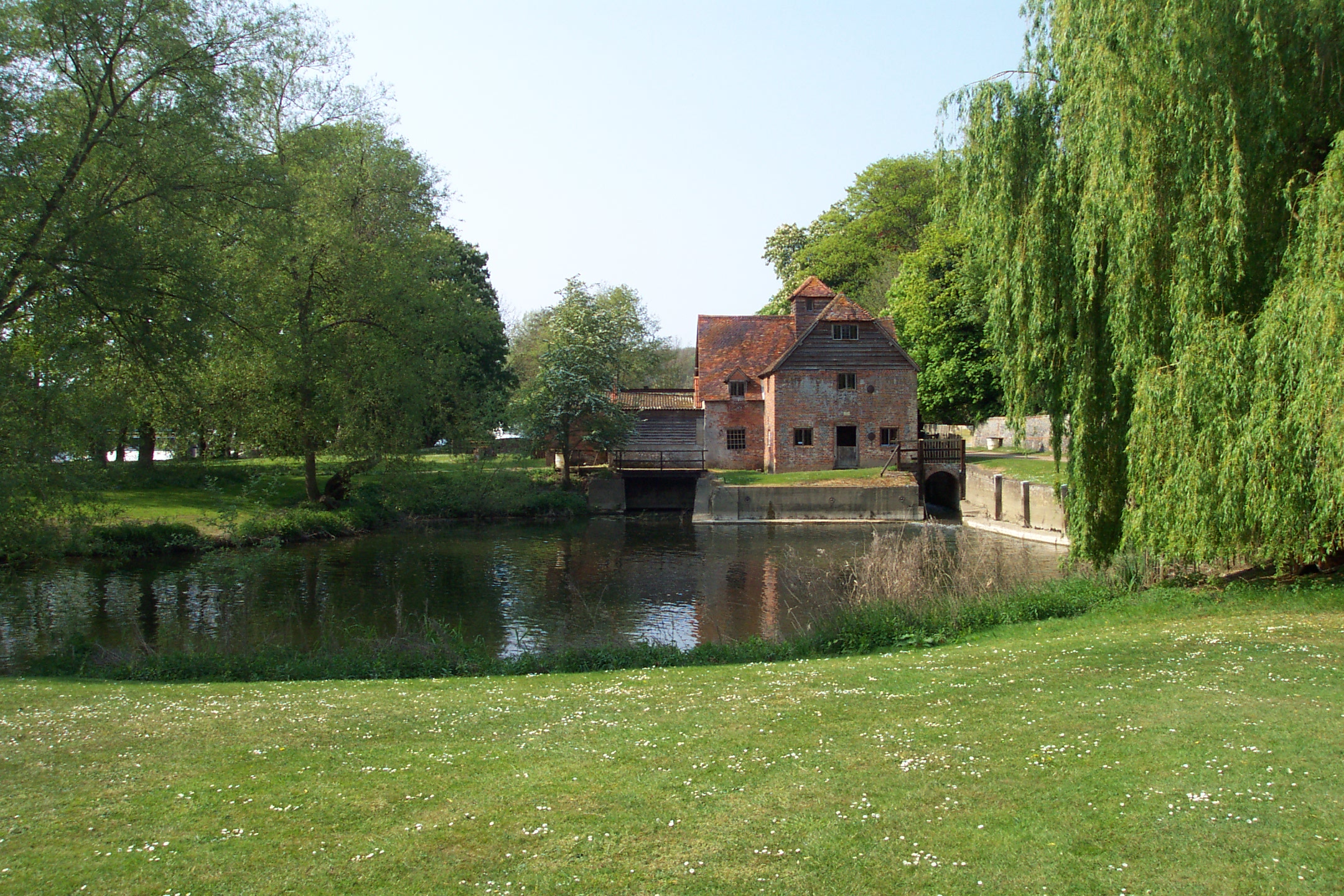
Mapledurham Watermill from the lawns of the house

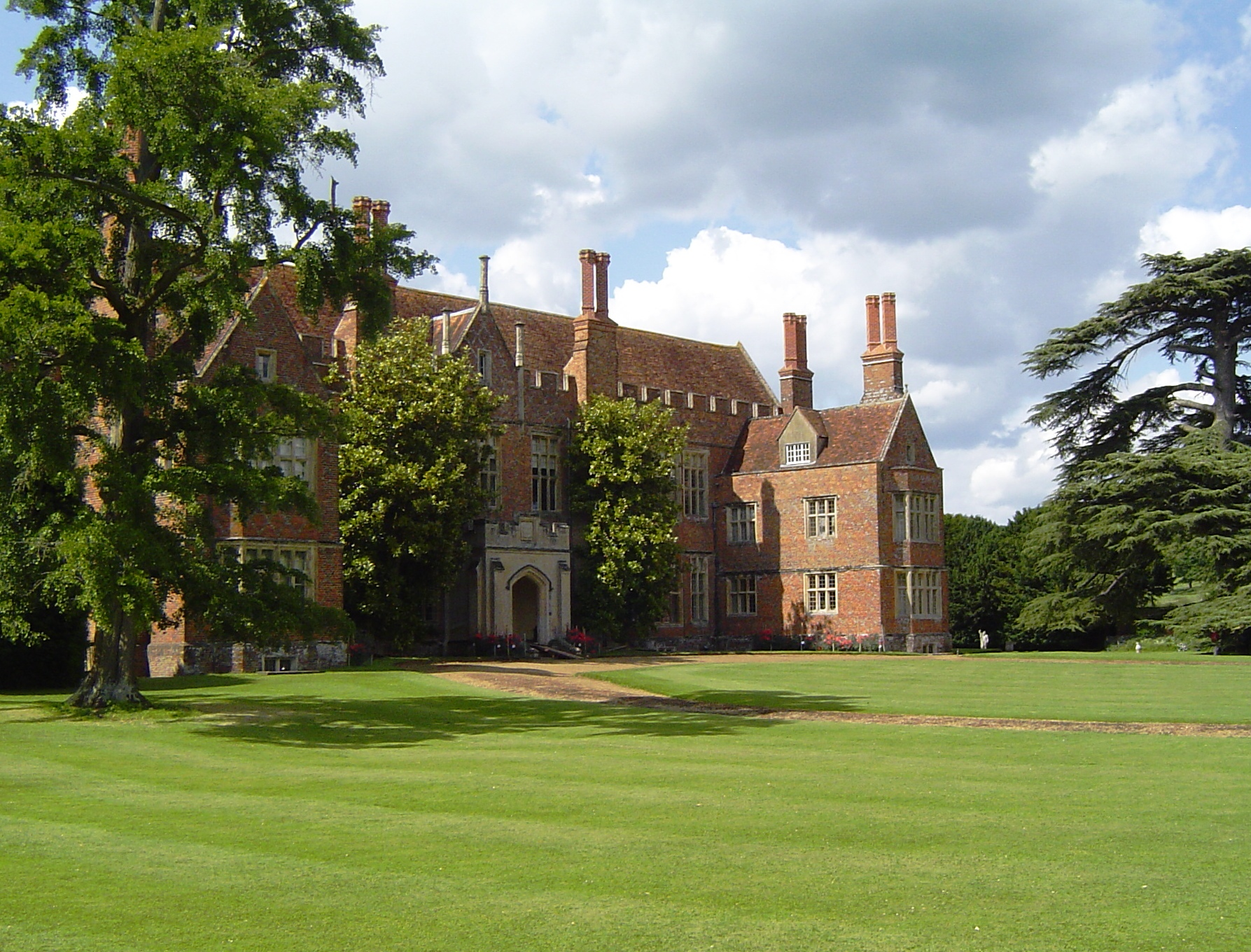
Mapledurham House seen from the lawns

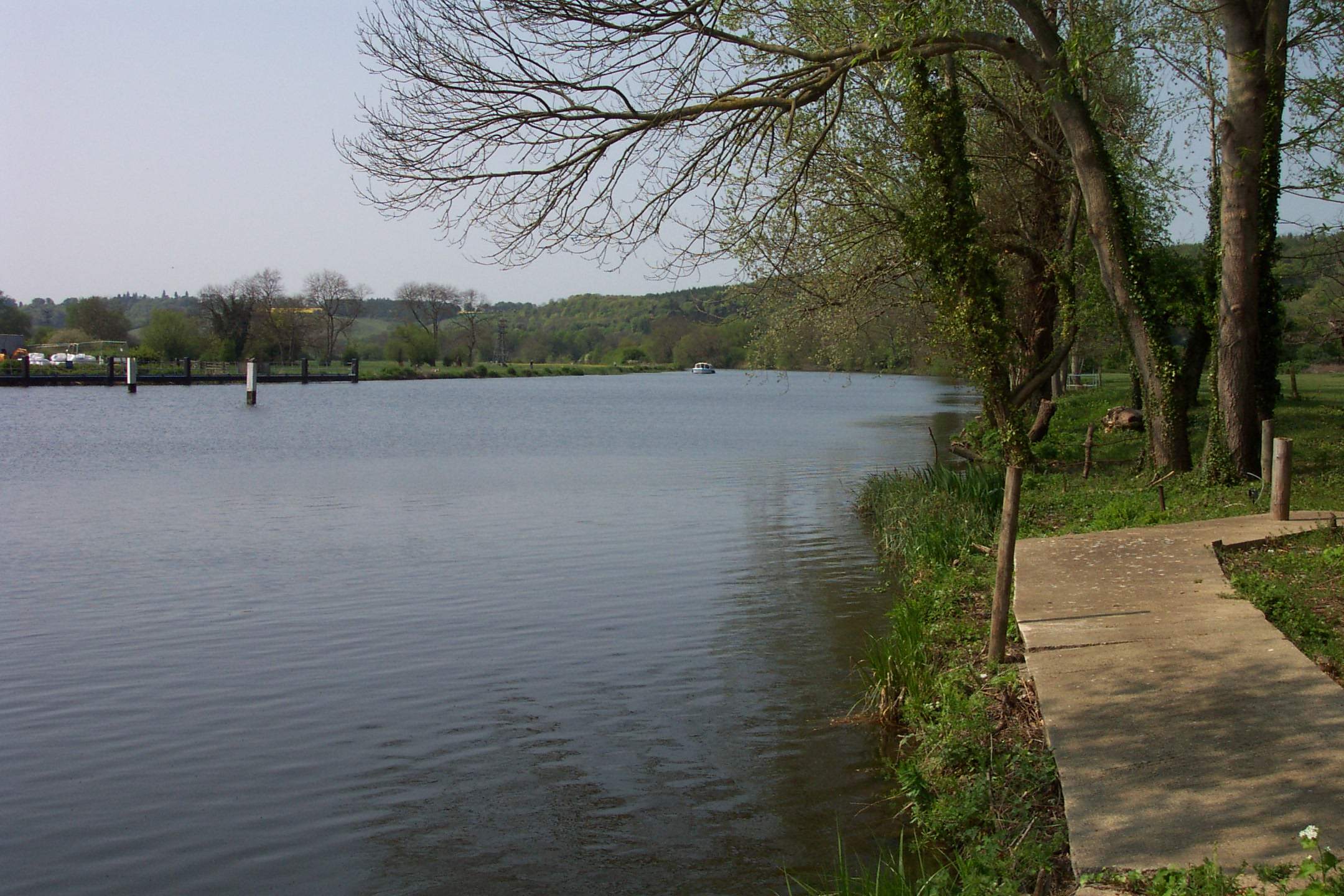
The River Thames, looking upstream from the village

== Bibliography ==
- Explorer Map 159 – Reading (Map). 1:25000. Ordnance Survey. 2006. ISBN 0-319-23730-3.
- Sherwood, Jennifer; Pevsner, Nikolaus (1974). The Buildings of England: Oxfordshire. Harmondsworth: Penguin Books. ISBN 0-14-071045-0.
