= Toad Hall =

Fictional home of Mr. Toad

- 'The Wind in the Willows' location
- The 1913 edition of the novel
- Created by: Kenneth Grahame
- Genre: novel

In-universe information
- Location: The Thames Valley

Toad Hall is the fictional home of Mr. Toad, a character in the 1908 novel The Wind in the Willows by Kenneth Grahame.

== History ==
Kenneth Grahame's mother died when he was five years old. He then went to live with his grandmother and uncle at their house, The Mount, which was a large country house overlooking the Thames in Cookham Dean. His uncle, David, introduced him to the rustic locality and this was influential in his later creation of Wind in the Willows.

On his retirement from the Bank of England in 1908, Grahame returned to Cookham Dean, staying in a house called Mayfield. An inspiration for the character, Mr Toad, was the local philanthropist Colonel Ricardo – an ebullient character who owned the first motor car in the village – a yellow Rolls-Royce Silver Ghost. He would offer lifts to the locals and was well-known as a motoring enthusiast. Ricardo lived at Lullebrook Manor on Formosa Island, a large eyot in the Thames.

In October 1908, The Wind in the Willows was published as a novel for children featuring an array of anthropomorphic characters, including Rat (a water vole), Mole, Badger and Toad. Toad lives in a house on the edge of the River Bank, Toad Hall. The novel was almost universally condemned by critics, but achieved very considerable sales. It has been in print continuously since its publication and has been adapted for plays, a ballet, films and musicals. Originally published as plain text, it has subsequently been illustrated by a number of notable artists including Paul Bransom, Arthur Rackham and E. H. Shepard.

The decline, loss and recovery of Toad Hall, which forms the trajectory of the novel, has been seen as an allegory for the state of England at the time of the book's writing. Toad, through his profligacy and caprice, threatens the prevalent social order, "letting down his class and exposing it to danger". He symbolises a decadent aristocracy that "squanders his inheritance [and is] indifferent to his house"; the weasels and stoats, which overrun the hall, are the (working) "class enemy"; while Badger, Rat and Mole are the "bourgeois intelligentsia" who alone can save the "Ancestral Home" and restore the social status quo. Toad Hall itself "dominates" the story, and symbolises the Arcadian pastoral landscape that is The Wind in the Willows, in the same relationship as Woburn Abbey or West Wycombe Park to their Reptonian parklands.

== Description ==
Grahame's description of Toad Hall is sparse: "a handsome, dignified old house of mellowed red brick, with well-kept lawns reaching down to the water's edge". Its owner is in no doubt as to its merits: "'Finest house on the whole river,' cried Toad boisterously. 'Or anywhere else, for that matter.'" The hall has a "very old banqueting-hall, stables stand to the right of the house, as viewed from the river" and a "large boat-house" is located on the riverbank. Despite Toad's pride in, or vanity regarding, his ancestral home, he takes little care over its maintenance. The grounds, and the boathouse are filled with discarded cars and boats, abandoned by Toad as he moves on to his latest passion, caravanning. An ancient underground passage, unknown to Toad but vouchsafed to Mr Badger by Toad's father, and of critical importance to the novel's denouement, "leads from the river bank ..., right up into the middle of Toad Hall". Using the tunnel to gain access to the house, the ensuing battle between Toad's supporters and the weasels has been described as a "masterpiece of asymmetrical warfare".

== Inspirations ==
A number of houses have been cited as the inspiration for Toad Hall. These include:

- Fawley Court in Buckinghamshire;
- Fowey Hall Hotel in Cornwall;
- Foxwarren Park in Surrey;
- Hardwick House in Oxfordshire;
- Mapledurham House also in Oxfordshire.

The house's title has also been an inspiration in the subsequent century: examples of Toad Hall are found in a 1930s mansion in Aiken, South Carolina by the architect Willis Irvin; the de Menil residence designed by Charles Gwathmey in Amagansett, New York; an estate in the Virgin Islands; and a restaurant in Fantasyland at Disneyland Paris.

== Gallery of claimants ==
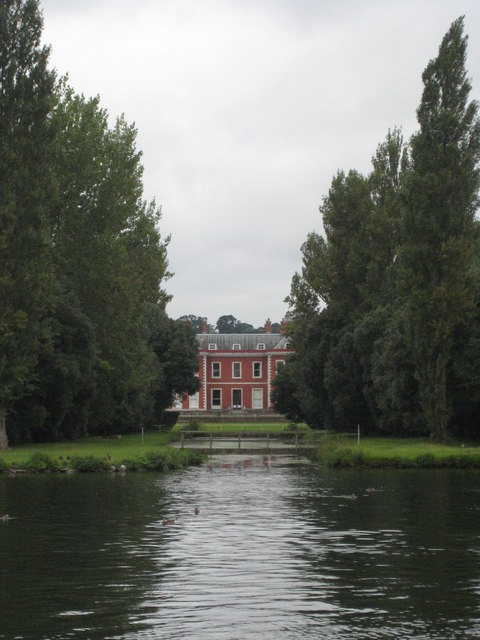
Fawley Court, Buckinghamshire

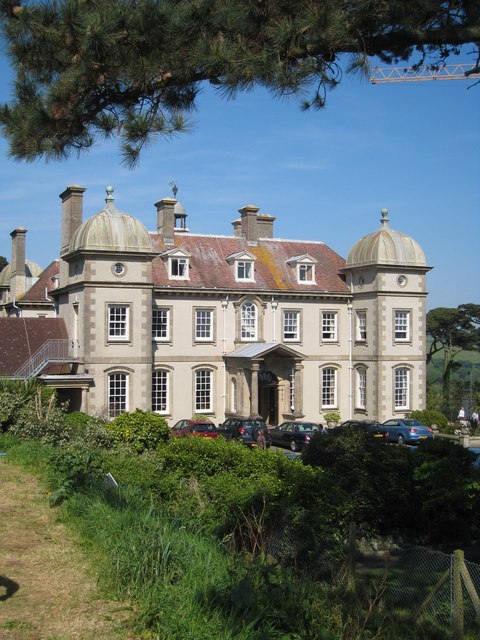
Fowey Hall Hotel, Cornwall

Foxwarren Park, Surrey

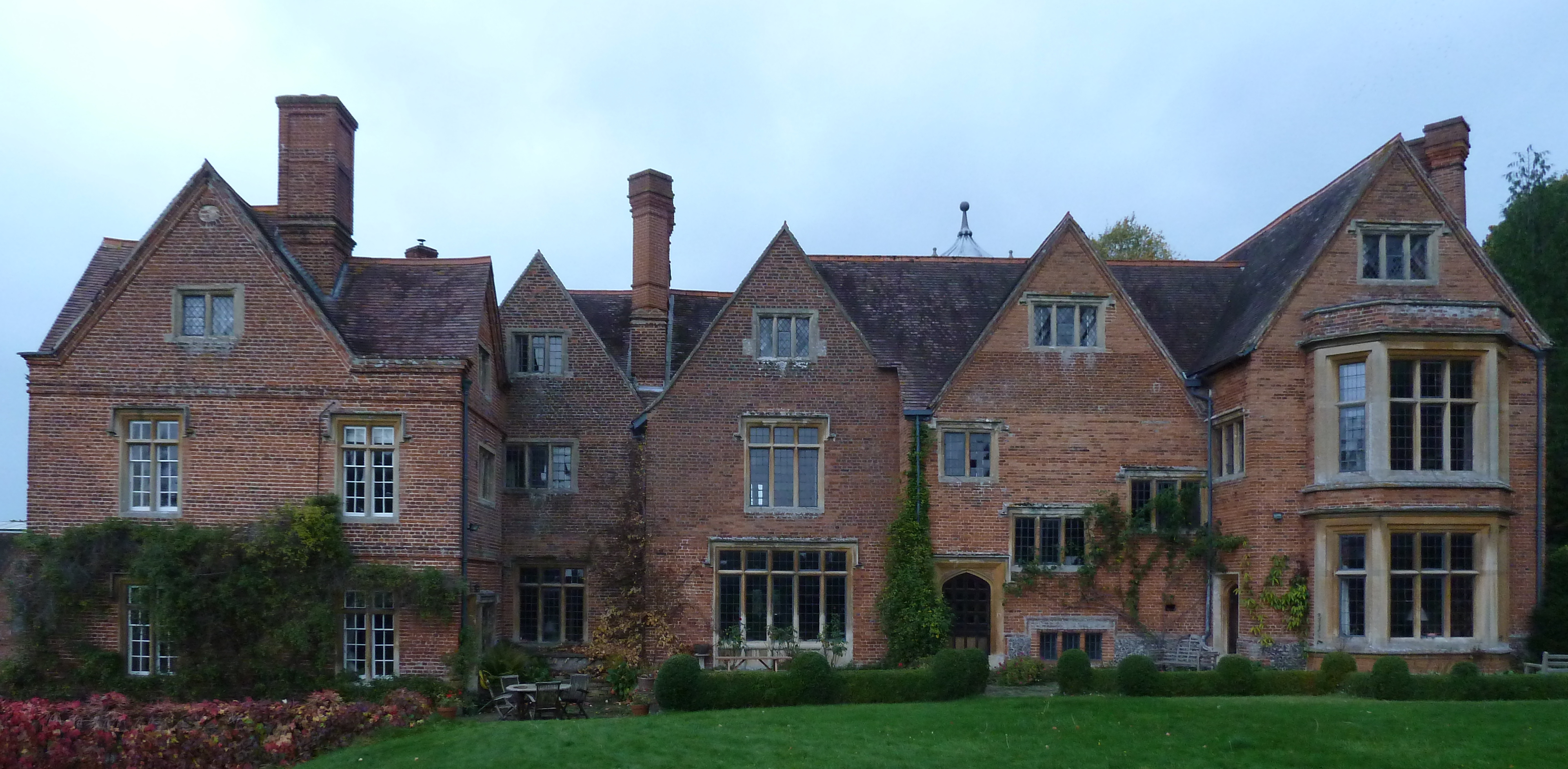
Hardwick House, Oxfordshire

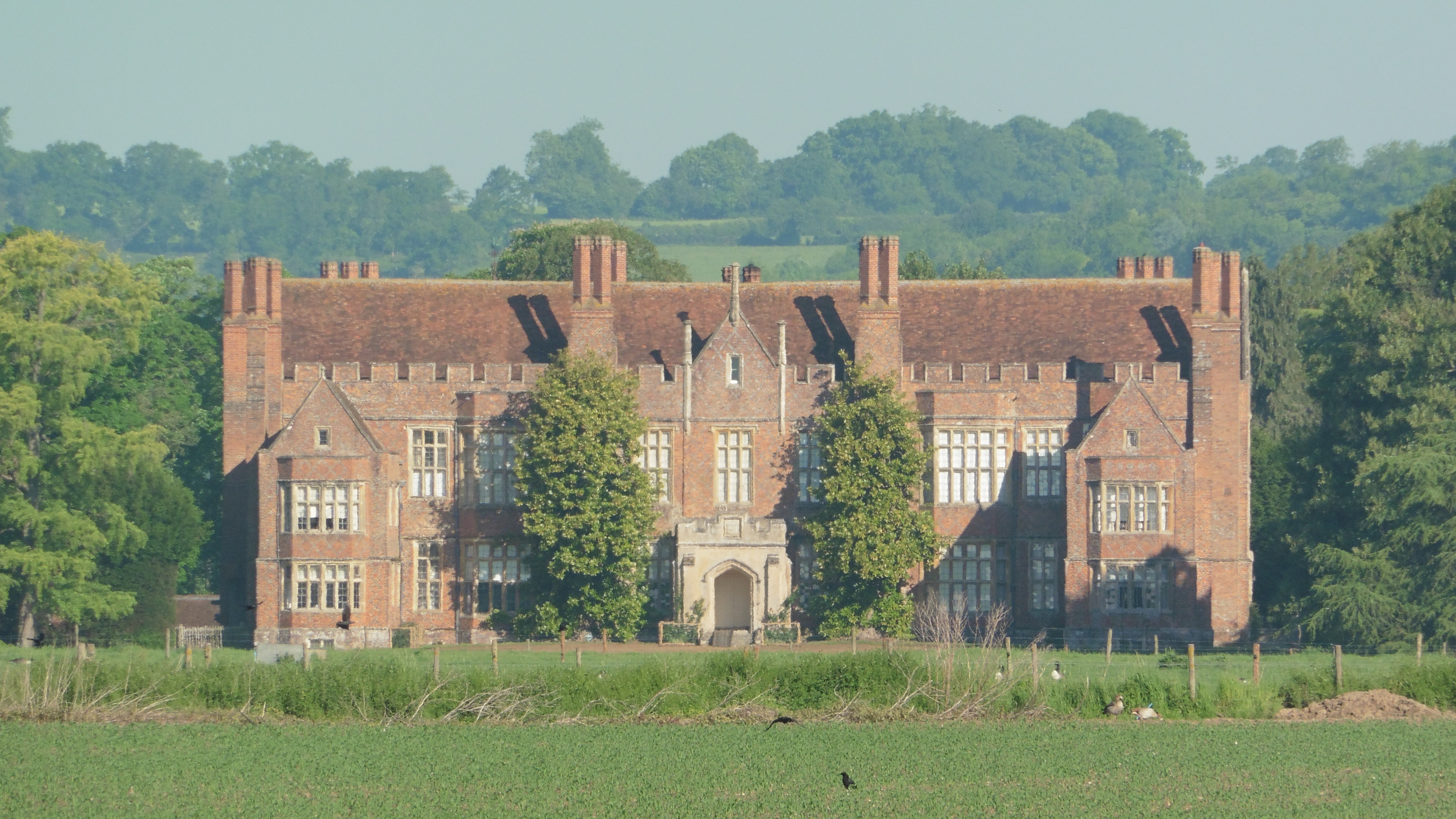
Mapledurham House, Oxfordshire

== Sources ==
- Albritton, Thomas (2021). Educational Theory in British Children's Classics: Teaching and Learning down the rabbit hole. Maryland, US: Lexington Books. ISBN 978-1-793-61631-9.
- Geer, Jennifer (2010). "10". In Jackie C. Horne; Donna R. White (eds.). Kenneth Grahame's The Wind in the Willows: A Children's Classic at 100. Maryland, US: Scarecrow Press. ISBN 978-0-810-87258-5.
- Grahame, Kenneth (1995). The Wind in the Willows. London: The Folio Society. OCLC 38040126.
- Moore, John David (1990). "Pottering About in the Garden: Kenneth Grahame's Version of Pastoral in The Wind in the Willows" (PDF). Journal of the Midwest Modern Language Association. 23 (1): 45–60. doi:10.2307/1315036. JSTOR 1315036.
- Winnifrith, Tom (1992). Leisure in Art and Literature. London: Palgrave Macmillan. ISBN 978-1-349-11353-8.
