= Mapledurham House =

Elizabethan stately home in Oxfordshire, England

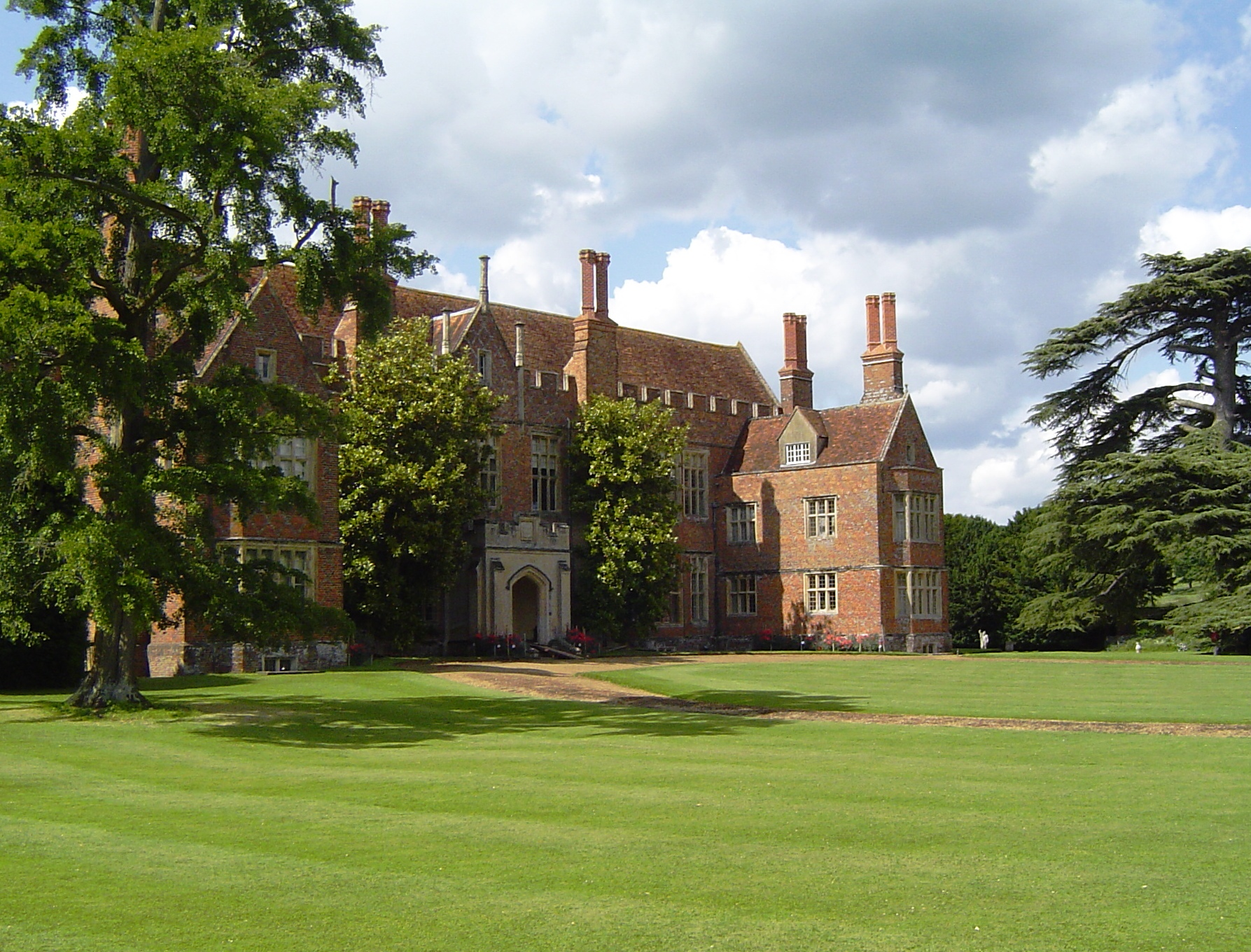

- Location within Oxfordshire
- 51°29′5.28″N 1°2′7.80″W
- Location: Mapledurham, Oxfordshire, England

History
- Built: c.1585; 441 years ago

Site notes
- Governing body: Mapledurham Estate

Listed Building – Grade I
- Official name: Mapledurham House
- Designated: 24 October 1951
- Reference no.: 1368944

Mapledurham House is an Elizabethan stately home located in the civil parish of Mapledurham in the English county of Oxfordshire. It is a Grade I listed building, first listed on 24 October 1951.

== History and architecture ==
The manor of Mapledurham was bought in 1490 by Richard Blount of Iver however the current house was started by Sir Michael Blount (c1530-1610) and has remained in the Blount-Eyston family to this day. Building was started around 1585, at the time of the Spanish Armada, in the classic Elizabethan E-shape. It includes a late 18th-century chapel built in the Strawberry Hill Gothic Revival style for the recusant Roman Catholic owners of the house.

Prior to the Catholic Emancipation, the owners would hide priests in its priest holes, some of which were only discovered in the 21st century, and secretly celebrate Mass with a makeshift altar hidden inside a writing desk. The estate covers much of the village including Mapledurham Watermill and part of the church.

Anne of Denmark stayed at Mapledurham in August 1612 as a guest of Sir Richard Blount, before meeting James VI and I at Woodstock Palace.

== Art and Literary associations ==
The poet Alexander Pope was a frequent visitor to the house as he was enamoured of Teresa and Martha Blount. The house and surrounding village were used for the filming of the 1976 film of The Eagle Has Landed and also for several television series, including Midsomer Murders. It is also reputed to have been the inspiration for E. H. Shepard's illustrations of Toad Hall for Kenneth Grahame's The Wind in the Willows, although this is also claimed by Hardwick House, Fowey Hall Hotel, Foxwarren Park and Fawley Court.

== Noise complaints ==
Sight-seeing helicopter flights run from the estate, with up to 70 short flights per day, caused complaints about noise levels, with one local resident describing it in 2013 as like being "in Vietnam during a high intensity attack". A representative of the estate responded by saying that they had taken account of the complaints by reducing the number of helicopter flight days from 20 to 10 per year.

== Gallery ==
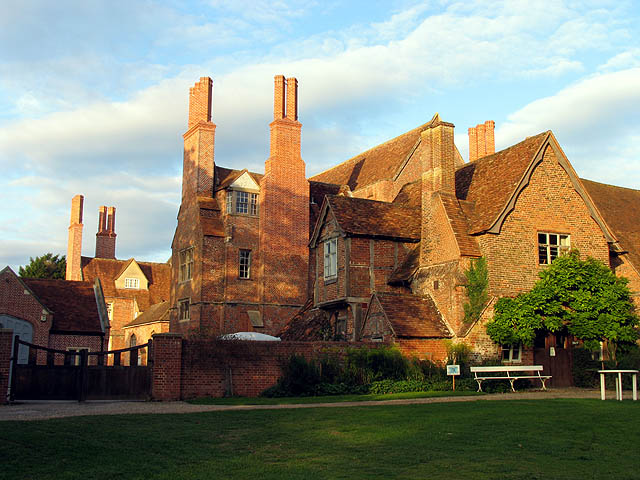
Mapledurham House

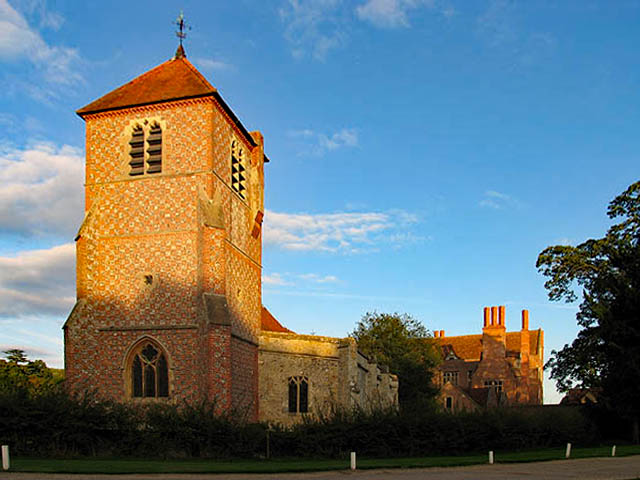
The Church at Mapledurham House

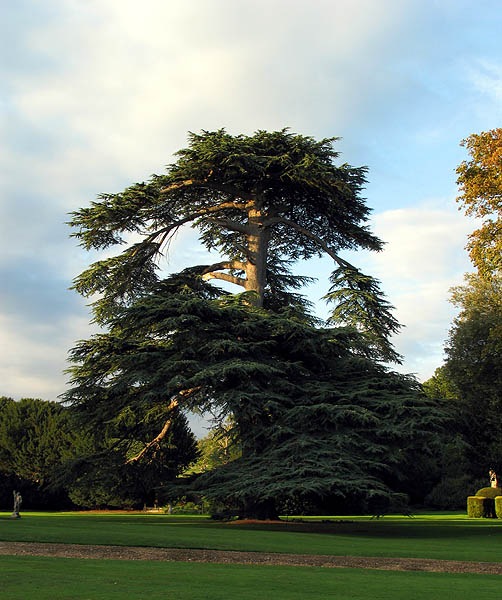
Majestic Tree

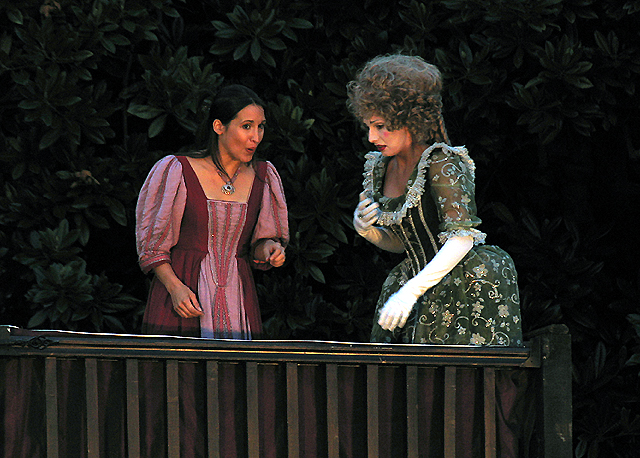
"The Marriage of Figaro" at Mapledurham House
