= Goring Heath =

Hamlet in Oxfordshire, England

Coordinates: 51.520°N 1.097°W

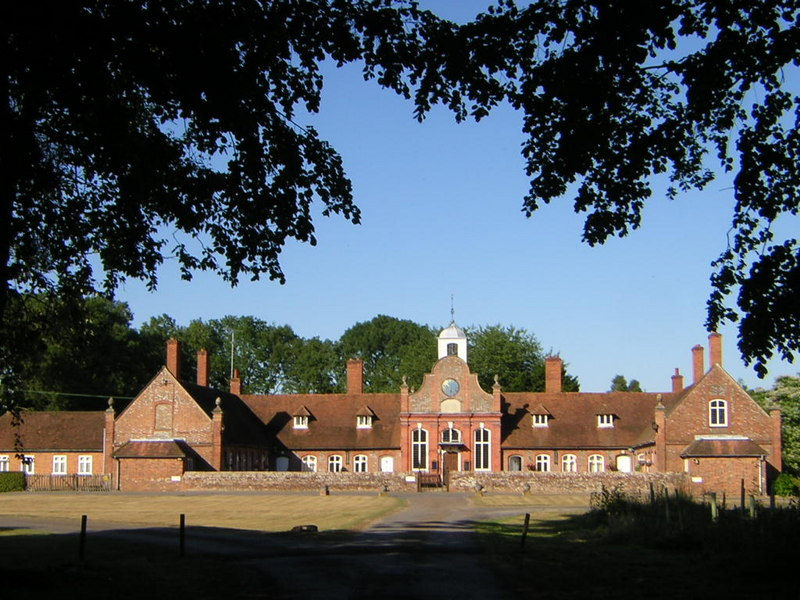
- Allnutt's Hospital almshouses, Goring Heath, seen from the southwest

- Location within Oxfordshire
- Area: 11.44 km^{2} (4.42 sq mi)
- Population: 1,227 (parish, including Whitchurch Hill) (2011 census)
  - Density: 107/km^{2} (280/sq mi)
- OS grid reference: SU6579
- Civil parish: Goring Heath
- District: South Oxfordshire
- Shire county: Oxfordshire
- Region: South East
- Country: England
- Sovereign state: United Kingdom
- Post town: Reading
- Postcode district: RG8
- Police: Thames Valley
- Fire: Oxfordshire
- Ambulance: South Central
- UK Parliament: Henley and Thame
- Website: Goring Heath community website

Goring Heath is a hamlet and civil parish in the Chiltern Hills in South Oxfordshire. The civil parish includes the villages of Whitchurch Hill and Crays Pond and some small hamlets. Goring Heath is centred 3 miles (4.8 km) southeast of Goring-on-Thames and about 4 miles (6.4 km) northwest of Reading, Berkshire. In 1724 Henry Alnutt, a lawyer of the Middle Temple in London, established a set of almshouses at Goring Heath. They form three sides of a courtyard, flanking a chapel of the same date. In the 1880s a school was built beside the almshouses in what was intended to be the same architectural style. A post office was added in 1900.

Alnutt also left a continuing income from his estate at Goring Heath to teach, clothe and apprentice boys from five parishes. One of the parishes was Cassington in West Oxfordshire, where Alnutt's charity established a small school for boys. In 1833 the Alnutt school was absorbed into a new Cassington parish school, which in 1853 became Cassington's present St. Peter's Church of England primary school.

== Sources ==
- Baggs, A.P.; Blair, W.J.; Chance, Eleanor; Colvin, Christina; Cooper, Janet; Day, C.J.; Selwyn, Nesta; Townley, S.C. (1990). Crossley, Alan; Elrington, C.R. (eds.). Victoria County History: A History of the County of Oxford, Volume 12: Wootton Hundred (South) including Woodstock. p. 53. ISBN 978-0-19-722774-9.
- Sherwood, Jennifer; Pevsner, Nikolaus (1974). The Buildings of England: Oxfordshire. Harmondsworth: Penguin. pp. 616–617. ISBN 0-14-071045-0.
