= Bernard Williams =

English philosopher (1929–2003)

Sir Bernard Williams FBA
- Born: Bernard Arthur Owen Williams; 21 September 1929; Westcliff-on-Sea, England
- Died: 10 June 2003 (aged 73); Rome, Italy
- Spouses: Shirley Brittain Catlin (m. 1955; div. 1974); Patricia Law Skinner (m. 1974)
- Children: 3

Education
- Education: Chigwell School
- Alma mater: Balliol College, Oxford
- Academic advisors: R. M. Hare; Gilbert Ryle

Philosophical work
- Era: Contemporary philosophy
- Region: Western philosophy
- School: Analytic philosophy
- Institutions: All Souls College, Oxford; New College, Oxford; University College, London; Bedford College, London; King's College, Cambridge; University of California, Berkeley; Corpus Christi College, Oxford
- Doctoral students: Jeff McMahan; Miranda Fricker
- Notable students: Myles Burnyeat
- Main interests: Ethics
- Notable ideas: Internal reasons for action, moral luck, dirty hands, demandingness objection

Sir Bernard Arthur Owen Williams (21 September 1929 – 10 June 2003) was an English philosopher. His publications include Problems of the Self (1973), Ethics and the Limits of Philosophy (1985), Shame and Necessity (1993), and Truth and Truthfulness (2002). He was knighted in 1999.

As Knightbridge Professor of Philosophy at the University of Cambridge and Deutsch Professor of Philosophy at the University of California, Berkeley, Williams became known for his efforts to reorient the study of moral philosophy to psychology, history, and in particular to the Greeks. Described by Colin McGinn as an "analytical philosopher with the soul of a general humanist," he was sceptical about attempts to create a foundation for moral philosophy. Martha Nussbaum wrote that he demanded of philosophy that it "come to terms with, and contain, the difficulty and complexity of human life."

Williams was a strong supporter of women in academia; according to Nussbaum, he was "as close to being a feminist as a powerful man of his generation could be." He was also famously sharp in conversation. Gilbert Ryle, one of Williams's mentors at Oxford University, said that he "understands what you're going to say better than you understand it yourself, and sees all the possible objections to it, and all the possible answers to all the possible objections, before you've got to the end of your own sentence."

== Life ==
=== Early life and education ===
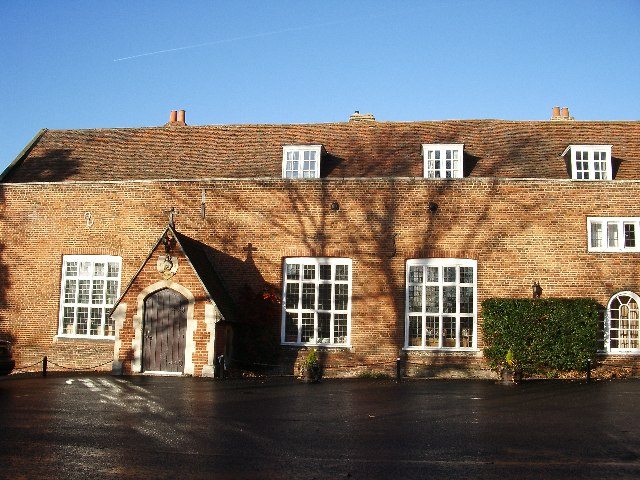
Chigwell School, Epping Forest, Essex

The young Bernard was in perpetual intellectual motion, like a dragonfly hovering above a sea of ideas. Everyone he encountered, every event that occurred were material for his insight and his wit.

— Shirley Williams, 2009

Williams was born in Westcliff-on-Sea, a suburb of Southend, Essex, to Hilda Amy Williams, née Day, a personal assistant, and Owen Pasley Denny Williams, chief maintenance surveyor for the Ministry of Works. He was educated at Chigwell School, an independent school, where he first discovered philosophy. Reading D. H. Lawrence led him to ethics and the problems of the self. In his first book, Morality: An Introduction to Ethics (1972), he quoted with approval Lawrence's advice to "[f]ind your deepest impulse, and follow that."

Awarded a scholarship to Oxford, Williams read Greats (pure classics followed by ancient history and philosophy) at Balliol. Among his influences at Oxford were W. S. Watt, Russell Meiggs, R. M. Hare, Elizabeth Anscombe, Eric Dodds, Eduard Fraenkel, David Pears and Gilbert Ryle. He shone in the first part of the course, the pure classics (being particularly fond of writing Latin verses in the style of Ovid) and graduated in 1951 with a congratulatory first in the second part of the course and a prize fellowship at All Souls.

After Oxford, Williams spent his two-year national service flying Spitfires in Canada for the Royal Air Force. While on leave in New York, he became close to Shirley Brittain Catlin (born 1930), daughter of the novelist Vera Brittain and the political scientist George Catlin. They had already been friends at Oxford. Catlin had moved to New York to study economics at Columbia University on a Fulbright scholarship.

Williams returned to England to take up his fellowship at All Souls and in 1954 became a fellow at New College, Oxford, a position he held until 1959. He and Catlin continued seeing each other. She began working for the Daily Mirror and sought election as a Labour MP. Williams, also a member of the Labour Party, helped her with the 1954 by-election in Harwich in which she was an unsuccessful candidate.

=== First marriage, London ===
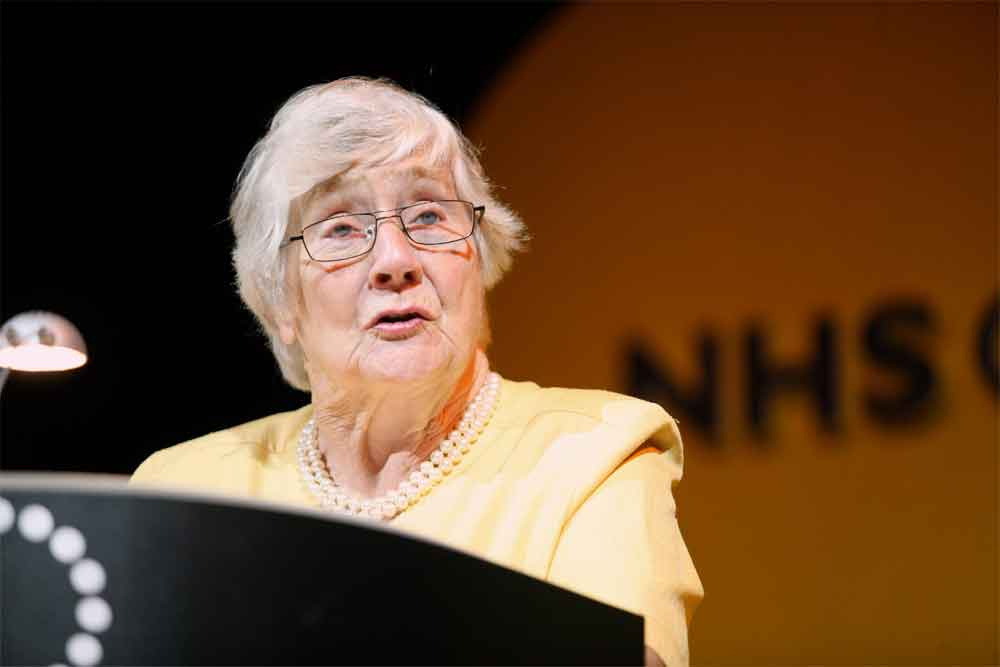
Shirley Williams, née Catlin, 2011

Bernard Williams and Shirley Catlin were married in London in July 1955 at St James's, Spanish Place, near Marylebone High Street, followed by a honeymoon in Lesbos, Greece.

The couple moved into a very basic ground-floor apartment in London, on Clarendon Road, Notting Hill. Given how hard it was to find decent housing, they decided instead to share with Helge Rubinstein and her husband, the literary agent Hilary Rubinstein, who at the time was working for his uncle, Victor Gollancz. In 1955, the four of them bought a four-storey, seven-bedroom house in Phillimore Place, Kensington, for £6,800, a home they lived in together for 14 years. Williams described it as one of the happiest periods of his life.

In 1958, Williams spent a term teaching at the University of Ghana in Legon. When he returned to England in 1959, he was appointed lecturer in philosophy at University College London. In 1961, after four miscarriages in four years, Shirley Williams gave birth to their daughter, Rebecca.

Williams was a visiting professor at Princeton University in 1963, and was appointed Professor of Philosophy at Bedford College, London, (merged with Royal Holloway, University of London) in 1964. His wife was elected to parliament that year as the Labour member for Hitchin in Hertfordshire. The Sunday Times described the couple two years later as "the New Left at its most able, most generous, and sometimes most eccentric." Andy Beckett wrote that they "entertained refugees from eastern Europe and politicians from Africa, and drank sherry in noteworthy quantities." Shirley Williams became a junior minister and, in 1971, Shadow Home Secretary. Several newspapers saw her as a future prime minister. She went on to co-found a new centrist party in 1981, the Social Democratic Party; Williams left the Labour Party to join the SDP, although he later returned to Labour.

=== Cambridge, second marriage ===
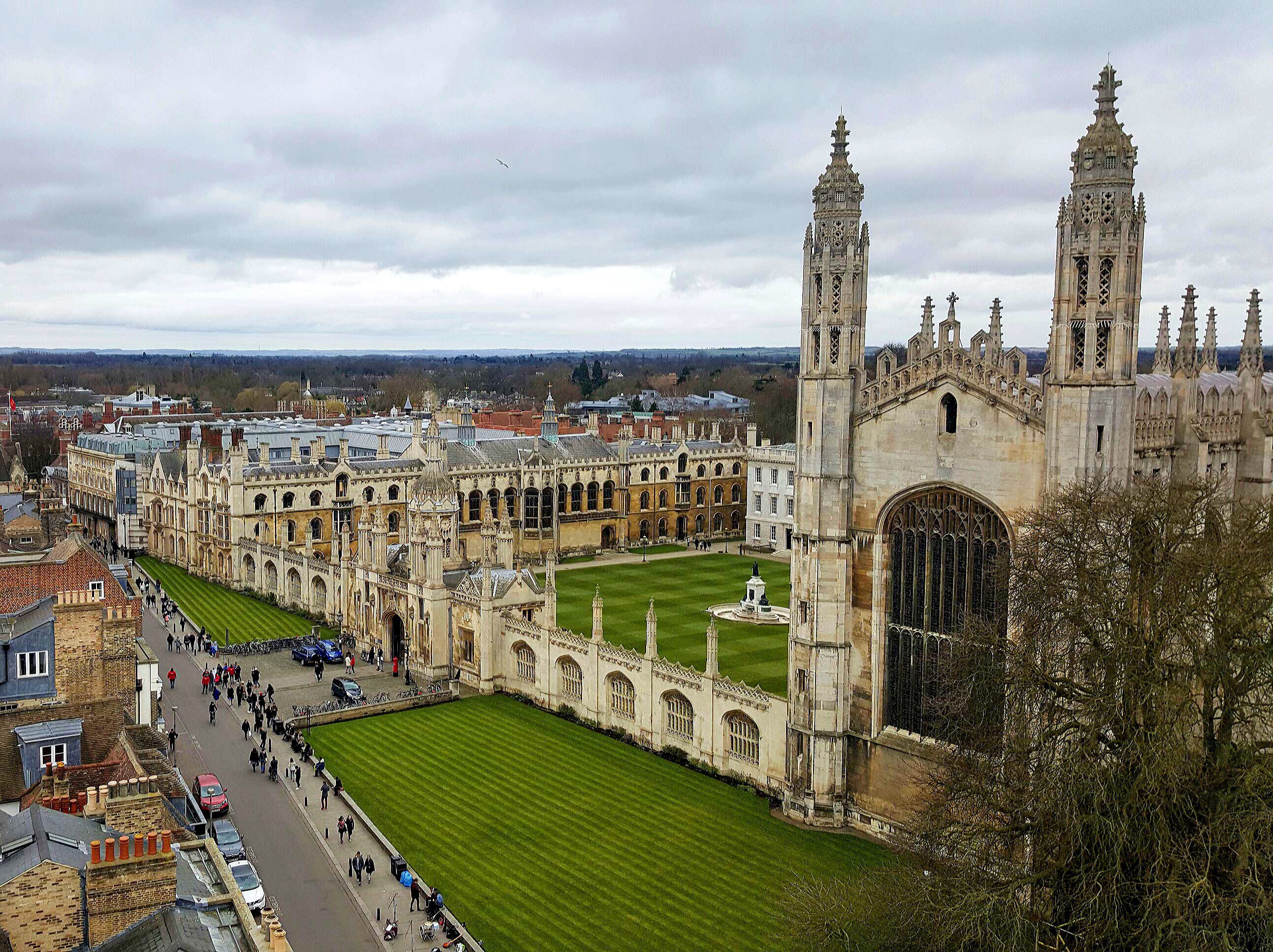
Williams spent over 20 years at King's College, Cambridge, eight of them as provost.

In 1967, at the age of 38, Williams became the Knightbridge Professor of Philosophy at the University of Cambridge and a fellow of King's College.

According to Jane O'Grady, Williams was central to the decision by King's in 1972 to admit women, one of the first three all-male Oxbridge undergraduate colleges to do so. In both his first and second marriages, he supported his wives in their careers and helped with the children more than was common for men at the time. In the 1970s, when Nussbaum's thesis supervisor, G. E. L. Owen, was harassing female students, and she decided nevertheless to support him, Williams told her, during a walk along the backs at Cambridge: "[Y]ou know, there is a price you are paying for this support and encouragement. Your dignity is being held hostage. You really don't have to put up with this."

Shirley Williams's political career (the House of Commons regularly sat until 10 pm) meant that the couple spent much of their time apart. They bought a house in Furneux Pelham, Hertfordshire, near the border with south Cambridgeshire, while she lived in Phillimore Place during the week to be close to the Houses of Parliament. Sunday was often the only day they were together. The differences in their personal values – he was an atheist, she a Catholic – placed a further strain on their relationship. (Note: Shirley Williams, 2002: "Ours was a very alive marriage, but there was something of a strain that comes from two things. One is that we were both too caught up in what we were respectively doing – we didn't spend all that much time together; the other, to be completely honest, is that I'm fairly unjudgmental and I found Bernard's capacity for pretty sharp putting-down of people he thought were stupid unacceptable. ... He can be very painful sometimes. He can eviscerate somebody. Those who are left behind are, as it were, dead personalities.") It reached breaking point in 1970 when Williams formed a relationship with Patricia Law Skinner, a commissioning editor for Cambridge University Press and wife of the historian Quentin Skinner. She had approached Williams to write the opposing view of utilitarianism for Utilitarianism: For and Against with J. J. C. Smart (1973), and they had fallen in love.

Williams and Skinner began living together in 1971. He obtained a divorce in 1974 (at Shirley Williams' request, the marriage was later annulled by the Catholic Church). Patricia Skinner married him that year, and the couple went on to have two sons, Jacob in 1975 and Jonathan in 1980. Shirley Williams married the political scientist Richard Neustadt in 1987.

=== Berkeley and Oxford ===
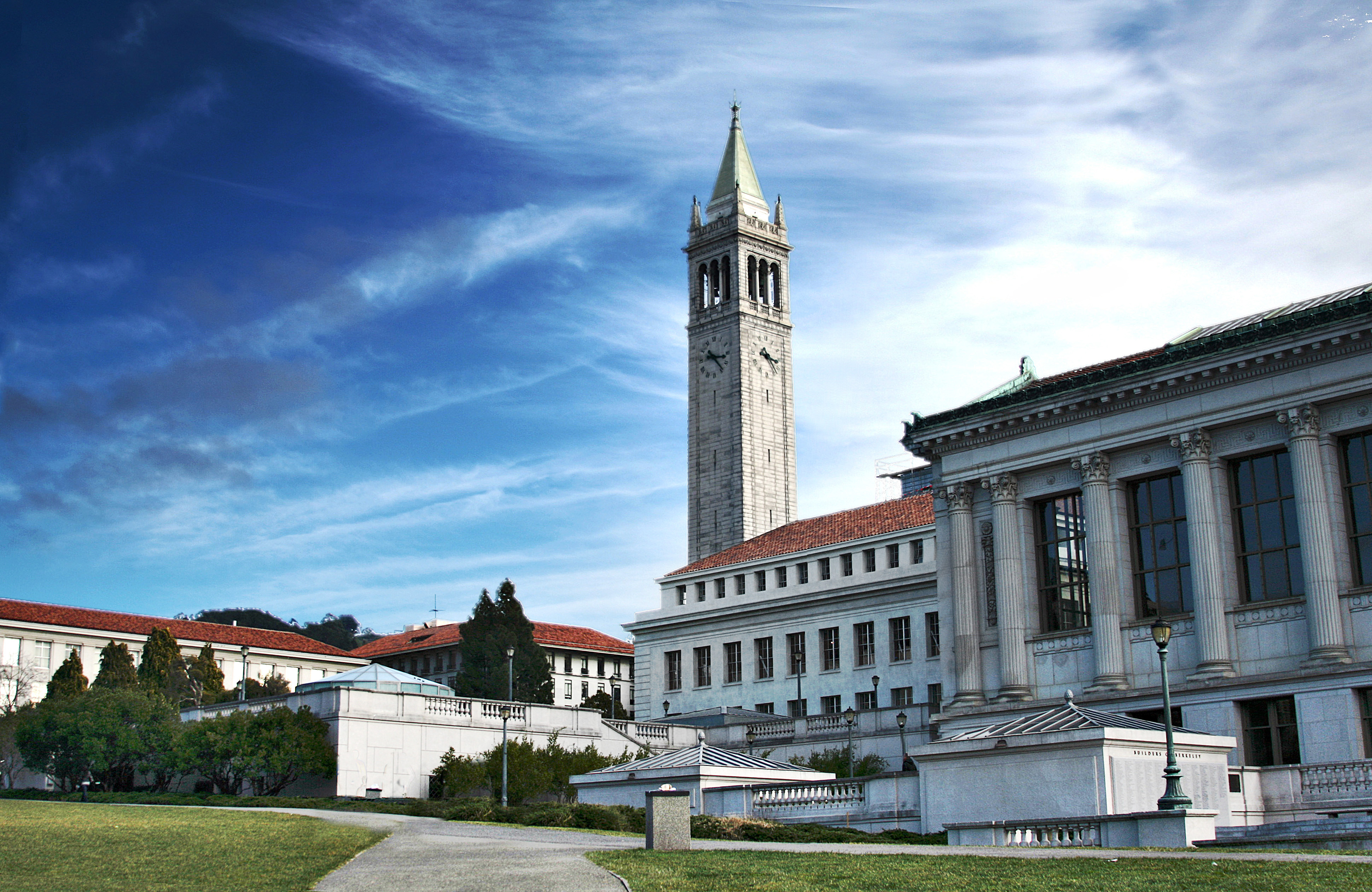
University of California, Berkeley

In 1979 Williams was elected Provost of King's, a position he held until 1987. He spent a semester in 1986 at the University of California, Berkeley as Mills Visiting Professor and in 1988 left England to become Monroe Deutsch Professor of Philosophy there, announcing to the media that he was leaving as part of the "brain drain" of British academics to America. He was also Sather Professor of Classical Literature at Berkeley in 1989; Shame and Necessity (1995) grew out of his six Sather lectures.

Williams returned to England in 1990 as White's Professor of Moral Philosophy at Oxford and fellow of Corpus Christi. His sons had been "at sea" in California, he said, not knowing what was expected of them, and he had been unable to help. He regretted having made his departure from England so public; he had been persuaded to do so to highlight Britain's relatively low academic salaries. (Note: Bernard Williams, 2002: "I was persuaded that there was a real problem about academic conditions and that if my departure was publicized this would bring these matters to public attention. It did a bit, but it made me seem narky, and when I came back again in three years it looked rather absurd. I came back for personal reasons – it's harder to live out there with a family than I supposed.") When he retired in 1996, he took up a fellowship again at All Souls.

=== Royal commissions, committees ===
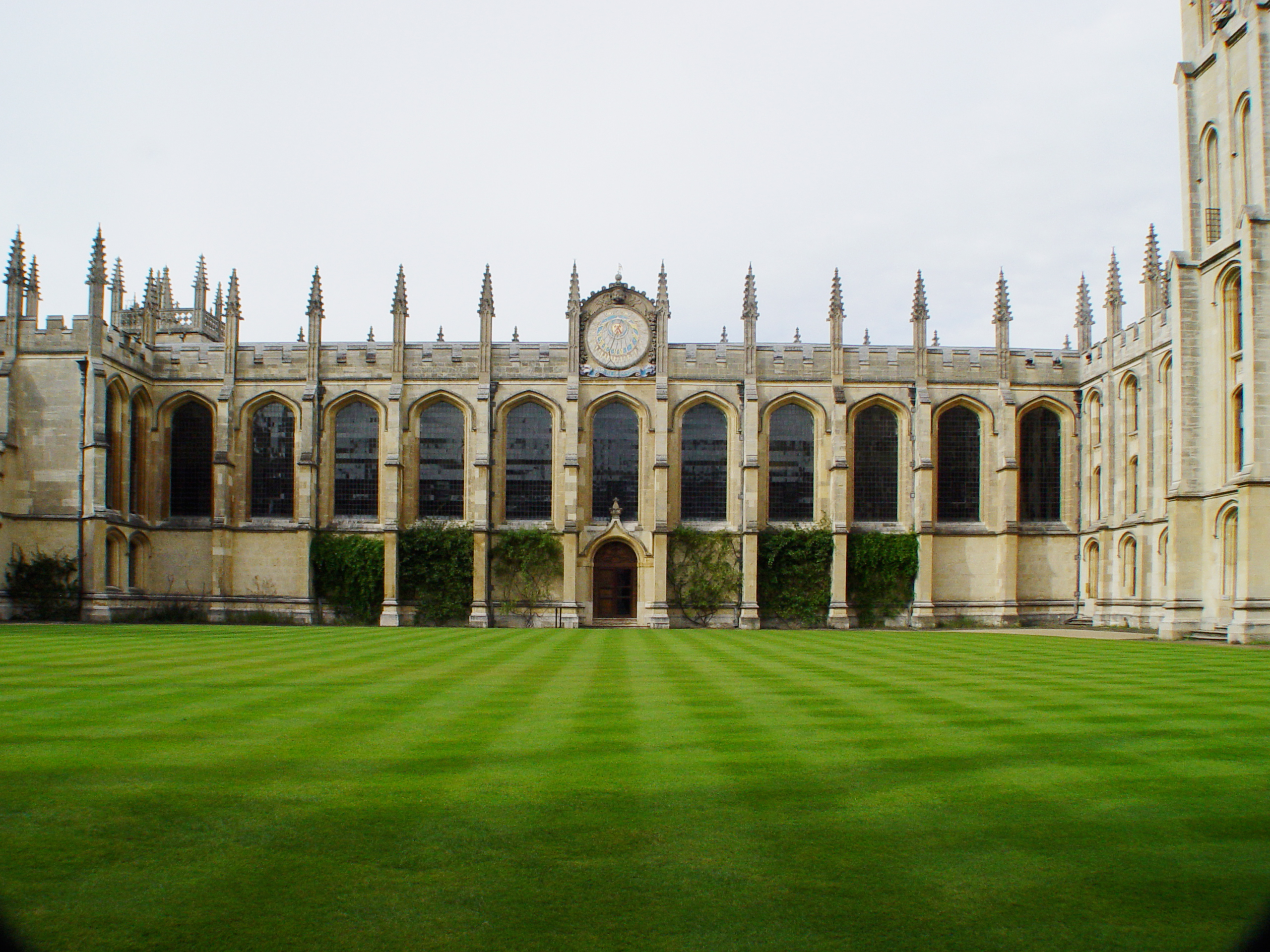
All Souls College, Oxford

Williams served on several royal commissions and government committees: the Public Schools Commission (1965–1970), drug abuse (1971), gambling (1976–1978), the Committee on Obscenity and Film Censorship (1979), and the Commission on Social Justice (1993–1994). "I did all the major vices," he said. While on the gambling commission, one of his recommendations, ignored at the time, was for a national lottery. (John Major's government introduced one in 1994.)

Mary Warnock described Williams's report on pornography in 1979, as chair of the Committee on Obscenity and Film Censorship, as "agreeable, actually compulsive to read." It relied on a "harm condition" that "no conduct should be suppressed by law unless it can be shown to harm someone," and concluded that so long as children were protected from pornography, adults should be free to read and watch it as they see fit. The report rejected the view that pornography tends to cause sexual offences. Two cases in particular were highlighted, the Moors Murders and the Cambridge Rapist, where the influence of pornography had been discussed during the trials. The report argued that both cases appeared to be "more consistent with pre-existing traits being reflected both in a choice of reading matter and in the acts committed against others."

=== Opera ===
Williams enjoyed opera from an early age, particularly Mozart and Wagner. Patricia Williams writes that he attended performances of the Carl Rosa Company and Sadler's Wells as a teenager. In an essay on Wagner, he described having been reduced to a "virtually uncontrollable state" during a performance by Jon Vickers as Tristan at Covent Garden. He served on the board of the English National Opera from 1968 to 1986, and wrote an entry, "The Nature of Opera," for The New Grove Dictionary of Opera. A collection of his essays, On Opera, was published posthumously in 2006, edited by Patricia Williams.

=== Honours and death ===
Williams became a member of the Institut international de philosophie in 1969, a fellow of the British Academy in 1971, and an honorary member of the American Academy of Arts and Sciences in 1983. The following year, he was made a syndic of the Fitzwilliam Museum in Cambridge and later the chair. In 1993, he was elected to a fellowship of the Royal Society of Arts, and in 1999, he was knighted. Several universities awarded him honorary doctorates, including Yale and Harvard.

Williams died of heart failure on 10 June 2003 while on holiday in Rome; he had been diagnosed in 1999 with multiple myeloma, a form of cancer. He was survived by his wife, their two sons, and his first child, Rebecca. He was cremated in Rome.

== Writing ==
=== Approach to ethics ===
A. W. Moore writes that Williams' work lies within the analytic tradition, although less typical of it "in its breadth, in its erudition, and above all in its profound humanity":

Although he was never a vigorous apologist for that tradition, he always maintained the standards of clarity and rigour which it prizes, and his work is a model of all that is best in the tradition. It is brilliant, deep, and imaginative. It is also extraordinarily tight. There cannot be many critics of his work who have not thought of some objection to what he says, only to find, on looking for a relevant quotation to turn into a target, that Williams carefully presents his views in a way that precisely anticipates the objection.

Williams did not produce any ethical theory or system; several commentators noted, unfairly in the view of his supporters, that he was largely a critic. Moore writes that Williams was unaffected by this criticism: "He simply refused to allow philosophical system-building to eclipse the subtlety and variety of human ethical experience." He equated ethical theories with "a tidiness, a systematicity, and an economy of ideas," writes Moore, that were not up to describing human lives and motives. Williams tried not to lose touch "with the real concerns that animate our ordinary ethical experience," unlike much of the "arid, ahistorical, second-order" debates about ethics in philosophy departments.

In his first book, Morality: An Introduction to Ethics (1972), Williams wrote that whereas "most moral philosophy at most times has been empty and boring ... [c]ontemporary moral philosophy has found an original way of being boring, which is by not discussing moral issues at all." He argued that the study of ethics should be vital, compelling and difficult, and he sought an approach that was accountable to psychology and history.

Williams was not an ethical realist, holding that, unlike scientific knowledge, which can approach an "absolute conception of reality," an ethical judgment rests on a point of view. He argued that the "thick" ethical concepts, such as kindness and cruelty, express a "union of fact and value." The idea that our values are not "in the world" was liberating: "[A] radical form of freedom may be found in the fact that we cannot be forced by the world to accept one set of values rather than another" said Williams.

Williams frequently emphasised what he saw as the ways in which luck pervades ethical life. He coined and developed the term moral luck, and illustrated the idea of moral luck via a number of enormously influential examples. One of Williams's famous examples of moral luck concerns the painter Paul Gauguin's decision to move to Tahiti.

=== Critique of Kant ===
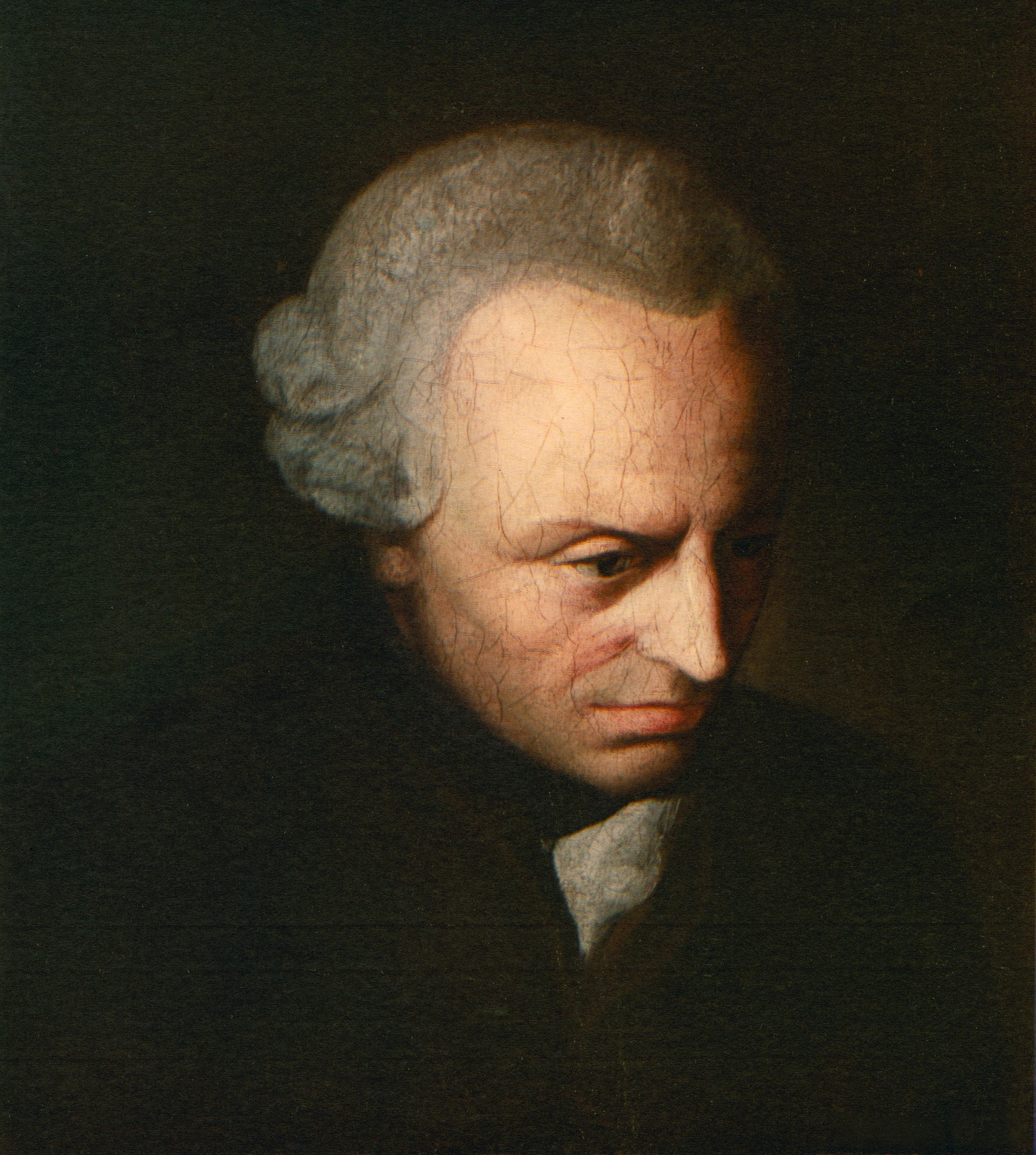
Immanuel Kant (1724–1804)

Williams's work throughout the 1970s and 1980s, in Morality: An Introduction to Ethics (1972), Problems of the Self (1973), Utilitarianism: For and Against with J. J. C. Smart (1973), Moral Luck (1981) and Ethics and the Limits of Philosophy (1985), outlined his attacks on the twin pillars of ethics: utilitarianism and the moral philosophy of the 18th-century German philosopher Immanuel Kant. Martha Nussbaum wrote that his work "denounced the trivial and evasive way in which moral philosophy was being practised in England under the aegis of those two dominant theories." "Both theories simplified the moral life," she wrote, "neglecting emotions and personal attachments and how sheer luck shapes our choices." (Williams said in 1996: "Roughly, if it isn't about obligation or consequences, it doesn't count.")

Kant's Grundlegung zur Metaphysik der Sitten (1785) expounded a moral system based on the categorical imperative, one formulation of which is: "Act only according to that maxim through which you can at the same time will that it become a universal law." (Note: Kant: "Der categorische Imperativ ist also nur ein einziger, und zwar dieser: "handle nur nach derjenigen Maxime, durch die du zugleich wollen kannst, daß sie ein allgemeines Gesetz werde.") Rational agents must act on "principles of pure rational agency," writes Moore; that is, principles that regulate all rational agents. But Williams distinguished between thinking and acting. To think rationally is to think in a way compatible with belief in the truth, and "what it takes for one to believe the truth is the same as what it takes for anyone else to believe the truth," writes Moore. But one can act rationally by satisfying one's own desires (internal reasons for action), and what it takes to do that may not be what it takes for anyone else to satisfy theirs. Kant's approach to treating thinking and acting alike is wrong, according to Williams.

Williams argued that Kant had given the "purest, deepest and most thorough representation of morality," but that the "honourable instincts of Kantianism to defend the individuality of individuals against the agglomerative indifference of Utilitarianism" may not be effective against the Kantian "abstract character of persons as moral agents." We should not be expected to act as though we are not who we are in the circumstances in which we find ourselves.

=== Critique of utilitarianism ===
Williams set out the case against utilitarianism – a consequentialist position, the simplest version of which is that actions are right only insofar as they promote the greatest happiness of the greatest number – in Utilitarianism: For and Against (1973) with J. J. C. Smart. One of the book's thought experiments involves Jim, a botanist doing research in a South American country led by a brutal dictator. Jim finds himself in a small town facing 20 captured Indian rebels. The captain who has arrested them says that if Jim will kill one, the others will be released in honour of Jim's status as a guest, but if he does not, they will all be killed. Simple act utilitarianism would favour Jim killing one of the men.

Williams argued that there is a crucial distinction between a person being killed by Jim and being killed by the captain because of an act or omission of Jim's. The captain, if he chooses to kill, is not simply the medium of an effect Jim is having on the world. He is the moral actor, the person with the intentions and projects. The utilitarian loses that distinction, turning us into empty vessels by means of which consequences occur. Williams argued that moral decisions must preserve our psychological identity and integrity. We should reject any system that reduces moral decisions to a few algorithms.

=== Reasons for action ===
Williams argued that there are only internal reasons for action: "A has a reason to φ if A has some desire the satisfaction of which will be served by his φ-ing." An external reason would be "A has reason to φ," even if nothing in A's "subjective motivational set" would be furthered by her φ-ing. Williams argued that it is meaningless to say that there are external reasons; reason alone does not move people to action.

Sophie-Grace Chappell argues that, without external reasons for action, it becomes impossible to maintain that the same set of moral reasons applies to all agents equally. In cases where someone has no internal reason to do what others see as the right thing, they cannot be blamed for failing to do it, because internal reasons are the only reasons, and blame, Williams wrote, "involves treating the person who is blamed like someone who had a reason to do the right thing but did not do it."

=== Truth ===
In his final completed book, Truth and Truthfulness: An Essay in Genealogy (2002), Williams identifies the two basic values of truth as accuracy and sincerity, and tries to address the gulf between the demand for truth and the doubt that any such thing exists. Jane O'Grady wrote in a Guardian obituary of Williams that the book is an examination of those who "sneer at any purported truth as ludicrously naive because it is, inevitably, distorted by power, class bias and ideology."

The debt to Friedrich Nietzsche is clear, most obviously in the adoption of a genealogical method as a tool of explanation and critique. Although part of Williams's intention was to attack those he felt denied the value of truth, the book cautions that, to understand it simply in that sense, would be to miss part of its purpose; rather, as Kenneth Baker wrote, it is "Williams' reflection on the moral cost of the intellectual vogue for dispensing with the concept of truth."

== Legacy ==
Williams did not propose any systematic philosophical theory; indeed, he was suspicious of any such attempt. He became known for his dialectical powers, although he was suspicious of them too. Alan Code wrote that Williams had never been "impressed by the display of mere dialectical cleverness, least of all in moral philosophy":

On the contrary, one of the most notable features of his philosophical outlook was an unwavering insistence on a series of points that may seem obvious but which are nevertheless all-too-frequently neglected: that moral or ethical thought is part of human life; that in writing about it, philosophers are writing about something of genuine importance; that it is not easy to say anything worth saying about the subject; that what moral philosophers write is answerable to the realities of human history, psychology, and social affairs; and that mere cleverness is indeed not the relevant measure of value."

Being in Williams's presence is at times painful because of that intensity of aliveness, which challenges the friend to something or other, and yet it was, and is, not terribly clear to what. To authenticity, I now think: to being and expressing oneself more courageously and clearly than one had done heretofore.

— Martha Nussbaum, 2015

In 1996, Martin Hollis said that Williams had "a good claim to be the leading British philosopher of his day," but that, although he had a "lovely eye for the central questions," he had none of the answers. Alan Thomas identified Williams's contribution to ethics as an overarching scepticism about attempts to create a foundation for moral philosophy, explicitly articulated in Ethics and the Limits of Philosophy (1985) and Shame and Necessity (1993), in which he argued that moral theories can never reflect the complexities of life, particularly given the radical pluralism of modern societies.

Learning to be yourself, to be authentic and to act with integrity, rather than conforming to any external moral system, is arguably the fundamental motif of Williams's work, according to Sophie Grace Chappell. "If there's one theme in all my work it's about authenticity and self-expression," Williams said in 2002. "It's the idea that some things are in some real sense really you, or express what you <are> and others aren't ... The whole thing has been about spelling out the notion of inner necessity." He moved moral philosophy away from the Kantian question, "What is my duty?", and back to the issue that mattered to the Greeks: "How should we live?"

== Publications ==
Books

- (with Alan Montefiore, eds.) British Analytical Philosophy, London: Routledge & Kegan Paul, 1966.
- Morality: An Introduction to Ethics, Cambridge: Cambridge University Press, 1972.
- Problems of the Self, Cambridge: Cambridge University Press, 1973.
- (with J. J. C. Smart) Utilitarianism: For and Against, Cambridge: Cambridge University Press, 1973.
- Descartes: The Project of Pure Enquiry, London: Pelican Books, 1978.
- Moral Luck: Philosophical Papers 1973–1980, Cambridge: Cambridge University Press, 1981.
- (with Amartya Sen) Utilitarianism and Beyond, Cambridge: Cambridge University Press, 1982.
- Ethics and the Limits of Philosophy, Cambridge: Harvard University Press, 1985.
- Shame and Necessity, Berkeley: University of California Press, 1993.
- Making Sense of Humanity, Cambridge: Cambridge University Press, 1995.
- The Great Philosophers: Plato, Abingdon: Routledge, 1998.
- Truth and Truthfulness: An Essay in Genealogy, Princeton: Princeton University Press, 2002.

Posthumously published

- In the Beginning was the Deed: Realism and Moralism in Political Argument, ed. Geoffrey Hawthorn, Princeton: Princeton University Press, 2005.
- The Sense of the Past: Essays in the History of Philosophy, ed. Myles Burnyeat, Princeton: Princeton University Press, 2006.
- Philosophy as a Humanistic Discipline, ed. A. W. Moore, Princeton: Princeton University Press, 2006.
- On Opera, ed. Patricia Williams, New Haven: Yale University Press, 2006.
- Essays and Reviews: 1959–2002, Princeton: Princeton University Press 2014.

Selected papers

- "Morality and the emotions," in Bernard Williams, Problems of the Self, Cambridge: Cambridge University Press, 1973, 207–229, first delivered in 1965 as Williams's inaugural lecture at Bedford College, London.
- "The Makropulos Case: Reflections on the tedium of immortality", in Bernard Williams, Problems of the Self, Cambridge: Cambridge University Press, 1973.
- "Pagan Justice and Christian Love," Apeiron 26(3–4), December 1993, 195–207.
- "Cratylus's Theory of Names and Its Refutation," in Stephen Everson (ed.), Language, Cambridge: Cambridge University Press, 1994.
- "The Actus Reus of Dr. Caligari". Pennsylvania Law Review. 142: 1661–1673. May 1994. Archived from the original on 8 October 2014.
- "Descartes and the Historiography of Philosophy," in John Cottingham (ed.), Reason, Will and Sensation: Studies in Descartes's Metaphysics, Oxford: Oxford University Press, 1994.
- "Acting as the Virtuous Person Acts," in Robert Heinaman (ed.), Aristotle and Moral Realism, Westview Press, 1995.
- "Ethics," in A. C. Grayling (ed.), Philosophy: A Guide Through the Subject, Oxford: Oxford University Press, 1995.
- "Identity and Identities," in Henry Harris (ed.), Identity: Essays Based on Herbert Spencer Lectures Given in the University of Oxford, Oxford: Oxford University Press, 1995.
- "Truth in Ethics," Ratio, 8(3), December 1995, 227–236.
- "On Hating and Despising Philosophy", London Review of Books, 18(8), 18 April 1996, 17–18 (courtesy link).
- "Contemporary Philosophy: A Second Look," in N. F. Bunnin (ed.), The Blackwell Companion to Philosophy, Blackwell, 1996.
- "History, Morality, and the Test of Reflection," in Onora O'Neill (ed.), The Sources of Normativity, Cambridge University Press, 1996.
- "Reasons, Values and the Theory of Persuasion," in Francesco Farina, Frank Hahn and Stafano Vannucci (eds.), Ethics, Rationality and Economic Behavior, Oxford: Oxford University Press, 1996.
- "The Politics of Trust," in Patricia Yeager (ed.), The Geography of Identity, Ann Arbor: University of Michigan Press, 1996.
- "The Women of Trachis: Fictions, Pessimism, Ethics," in R. B. Louden and P. Schollmeier (eds.), The Greeks and Us, Chicago: Chicago University Press, 1996.
- "Toleration: An Impossible Virtue?" in David Heyd (ed.), Toleration: An Elusive Virtue, Princeton: Princeton University Press, 1996.
- "Truth, Politics and Self-Deception," Social Research 63.3, Fall 1996.
- "Moral Responsibility and Political Freedom," Cambridge Law Journal 56, 1997.
- "Stoic Philosophy and the Emotions: Reply to Richard Sorabji," in R. Sorabji (ed.), Aristotle and After, Bulletin of the Institute of Classical Studies, Supplement 68, 1997.
- "Tolerating the Intolerable," in Susan Mendus (ed.), The Politics of Toleration, Edinburgh University Press, 1999.
- "Philosophy As a Humanistic Discipline," Philosophy 75, October 2000, 477–496.
- "Understanding Homer: Literature, History and Ideal Anthropology," in Neil Roughley (ed.), Being Humans: Anthropological Universality and Particularity in Transdisciplinary Perspectives, Walter de Gruyter, 2000.
- "Why Philosophy Needs History", London Review of Books, 24(20), 17 October 2002 (courtesy link).

== Notes ==
Academic offices
Preceded by Edmund Leach	Provost of King's College, Cambridge; 1979–1987	Succeeded by Patrick Bateson
