= Michael Rubinstein =

Michael Bernard Rubinstein (6 November 1920 – 12 January 2001) was a solicitor who specialised in representing authors and publisher. He acted for Penguin Books in the obscenity trial in 1960, R v Penguin Books Ltd., following publication of an uncensored edition of D.H. Lawrence's novel Lady Chatterley's Lover.

== Early life ==
Rubinstein was born in Kensington. His father Harold Rubinstein (1891–1975) was a solicitor with expertise in publishing matters; he acted on the unsuccessful defence of Radclyffe Hall's novel, The Well of Loneliness on obscenity charges in 1928. His mother, Lina Naomi Rubinstein, née Lowy (died 1939) was the sister of Ruth, wife of publisher Victor Gollancz. His father also wrote several plays, which were published by his brother-in-law. His younger brother Hilary Rubinstein became a publisher and literary agent.

Rubinstein was educated at St Paul's School, London. In the Second World War, he served in the Royal Engineers and then the Royal Artillery, being demobilized as a captain. He then studied law.

He married Edna Joy Smith Douthwaite in July 1955. She was a ballet dancer, better known under her stage name Joy Boulter. They had two daughters, Imogen and Polly and two sons, Adam and Zachary.

== Career ==
In 1948 Rubinstein joined his father as a lawyer at the family law firm Rubinstein, Nash & Co, founded by his grandfather Joseph Samuel Rubinstein in 1889. He specialised in representing publishers and authors, including Chatto & Windus, Sidgwick & Jackson, Hodder & Stoughton, Jonathan Cape, Victor Gollancz, and Penguin Books. He acted for Penguin Books in its successful defence on charges of obscenity in 1960 following publication of an uncensored edition of D.H. Lawrence's novel Lady Chatterley's Lover, marshalling 35 witnesses to testify to the book's literary merit.

He also represented several publishers in a Restrictive Practices Court case in 1962, which retained the Net Book Agreement that maintained minimum retail prices for books. The Net Book Agreement survived until 1997, when it was declared illegal by the same court.

Rubinstein acted for publishers in libel cases, including defending Leon Uris and William Kimber against a libel claim brought by Dr Wladislaw Dering in 1964 for passages in Uris's novel Exodus describing medical experiments conducted by Dering on prisoners at Auschwitz. Dering was awarded was a derisory half penny in damages, but faced substantial legal costs. Rubinstein was also a member of the Lord Chancellor's committee on defamation from 1971 to 1974, which made suggestions included in the Defamation Act 1996. His book Wicked, Wicked Libels was published in 1972.

He retired in 1994 and died at the Lister Hospital in Stevenage. He was survived by his wife, Joy, and their four children.

== Other ==
Rubinstein's hearing was damaged in the Second World War, but he still enjoyed music. He was a director of Youth and Music and a governor of the Purcell School. He also served the Society for the Promotion of New Music as trustee, chairman, and then vice-president. He published a book about music, Music to my Ear, in 1985.
