= Women Readers in French Painting 1870–1890 =

2012 book by Kathryn Brown

- First edition
- Author: Kathryn Brown
- Subject: 19th-century French art
- Published: 2012
- Publisher: Ashgate Publishing
- Pages: 254
- ISBN: 9781409408758

Women Readers in French Painting 1870–1890: A Space for the Imagination is a 2012 book by Kathryn Brown, in which the author deals with the depiction of reading women in French art of the early Third Republic.
