= Hilary Rubinstein =

Hilary Harold Rubinstein (26 April 1926 – 22 May 2012) was a British publisher and literary agent. He was described by Ion Trewin in an obituary published in The Guardian as "one of Britain's premier literary agents".

== Early and private life ==
Rubinstein was born in London. His father Harold F. Rubinstein (1891–1975) was a solicitor with expertise in publishing matters; he acted on the defence of Radclyffe Hall's novel, The Well of Loneliness on obscenity charges in 1928. His mother, Lina Naomi Rubinstein, née Lowy (died 1939) was the sister of Victor Gollancz's wife, Ruth. His father also wrote several plays, published by his brother-in-law Victor Gollancz. His elder brother Michael Rubinstein (1920–2001) also became a lawyer in the family firm, Rubinstein, Nash & Co, and acted for Penguin Books in its prosecution for obscenity after the publication of an uncensored version of D. H. Lawrence's novel Lady Chatterley's Lover in 1960.

Rubinstein was educated at Cheltenham College. He did national service with the Royal Air Force between 1944 and 1947, and then studied Philosophy, Politics and Economics at Merton College, Oxford.

He married Helge Kitzinger in 1955. Helge Rubinstein worked as a marriage guidance counsellor, published several cookery books, and founded the Ben's Cookies biscuit chain (named after their youngest son). They were close friends of politician Shirley Williams and her husband Bernard, living in the same house in West London together for a period.

He was survived by his wife, their three sons, and one daughter, the literary agent Felicity Rubinstein.

== Career ==
After university, Rubinstein became an editor at Gollancz. He encouraged the firm to publish Kingsley Amis's first novel Lucky Jim (Rubinstein and Amis had become acquainted at Oxford). He also expanded the firm's range of authors, adding science fiction written by J. G. Ballard, Robert Silverberg and Robert Heinlein. He worked at Gollancz for 13 years, from 1950 to 1963, and became a director in 1952, effectively becoming Victor Gollancz's deputy in 1954 after Sheila Hodges left. Eventually, Victor Gollancz appointed his daughter Livia Gollancz to succeed him in running the business. Conflicts with Gollancz led him to leave his job after 13 years.

Rubinstein left to work at The Observer from 1963 until 1965, and served as the deputy editor of the newspaper's colour magazine when it launched in 1964. He then became a literary agent at the long-established firm A. P. Watt, where he represented many successful clients, including Quentin Blake, Nadine Gordimer, Jan Morris, Geoffrey Moorhouse, P. G. Wodehouse, and the estates of G. K. Chesterton, Robert Graves, Rudyard Kipling, Somerset Maugham, H. G. Wells, and W. B. Yeats. For Michael Holroyd, he secured an advance of more than £600,000 from Chatto & Windus in 1987 for a four-volume biography of George Bernard Shaw. He also acted as agent for John Colville, private secretary to Winston Churchill, who published his memoirs The Fringes of Power: Downing Street Diaries 1939-1955.

He compiled an anthology, The Complete Insomniac, which was published in 1974, and in 1978, he founded and compiled The Good Hotel Guide, published by Which? alongside The Good Food Guide founded in 1951 by Raymond Postgate.

Rubinstein retired from AP Watt in 1992, but continued to work as a literary agent independently, controversially acting for Mary Bell, the 1960s child murderer, whose biography Cries Unheard written with Gitta Sereny was published in 1998.

He was a member of the council of the Institute of Contemporary Arts from 1976 to 1992, he was a trustee of the Open College of the Arts from 1987 to 1996.
