= Kathryn Brown =

British art historian

Kathryn Brown FHEA
- Education: Balliol College, Oxford (PhD), Birkbeck, University of London (PhD)
- Known for: works on Degas, Matisse and Tzara
- Spouse: Alan Thomas
- Scientific career
- Fields: 19th-century and 20th-century French art
- Institutions: Loughborough University, Tilburg University
- Theses: Baudelaire and the staging of absence: a study of the limits of poetry in Les Fleurs du Mal and Le Spleen de Paris (1994); Reading and a space for the imagination: the woman reader in French painting 1860-1890 (2007)
- Doctoral advisors: Malcolm Bowie

Kathryn Jane Brown FHEA is a British art historian and Lecturer in Art History and Visual Culture at Loughborough University.

== Career ==
Educated at Seymour College, Adelaide, and the University of Adelaide, South Australia, Brown was awarded a Rhodes Scholarship. As a Rhodes Scholar, she completed a PhD (D.Phil) at Balliol College, Oxford under the supervision of Malcolm Bowie. Brown then became a private equity lawyer in the City of London. Trained at Slaughter and May, Brown worked as an associate successively at Slaughter and May and then became an associate, and later Counsel, in the London office of US law firm Milbank, Tweed, Hadley and McCloy. She then became a partner of the US law firm Paul Hastings, LLP. Following the completion of a second PhD at the University of London Brown returned to academia as a postdoctoral researcher at the University of British Columbia. She was subsequently appointed to a Lectureship in Art History at Tilburg University before moving to Loughborough. Brown is a Fellow of the Higher Education Academy. She is best known for her works on 19th-century and 20th-century French art, modernism, artists’ books, museology, and the art market with a particular focus on the works of Degas, Matisse and Tzara.

== Books ==
- Matisse: A Critical Life], Reaktion Books, 2021
- Matisse’s Poets: Critical Performance in the Artist’s Book, Bloomsbury Academic, 2017
- Women Readers in French Painting 1870–1890, Ashgate, 2012

=== Edited ===
- The Art Book Tradition in Twentieth-Century Europe, Ashgate, 2013
- Interactive Contemporary Art: Participation in Practice, I.B. Tauris, 2014
- Perspectives on Degas, Routledge, 2017
