= Sophie Grace Chappell =

English philosopher (born 1964)

- Born: 1964 (age 61–62)
- Children: 4

Education
- Education: University of Edinburgh (PhD), Magdalen College, Oxford (BA)
- Thesis: Aristotle and Augustine on voluntary action and freedom and weakness of the will (1992)

Sophie Grace Chappell (born November 1964) is an English philosopher, academic, and poet. Since 2006, she has been a professor of philosophy at the Open University.

== Early life and education ==
Chappell was born in November 1964. She studied Literae humaniores at Magdalen College, Oxford, having been awarded the Anne Shaw Classical Scholarship. She achieved a first in Honour Moderations in March 1986 and an upper second in the Final Honour School in June 1988, thereby graduating with a Bachelor of Arts (BA) degree. She then moved to the University of Edinburgh to undertake research for a Doctor of Philosophy (PhD) degree under the supervision of James Mackey and Dory Scaltsas. She completed her PhD in 1992 with a thesis titled "Aristotle and Augustine on voluntary action and freedom and weakness of the will".

== Academic career ==
In 1991, Chappell returned to the University of Oxford and was a junior research fellow at Wolfson College, Oxford (1991–1994) and a lecturer in philosophy at Merton College, Oxford (1992–1994). She was then a lecturer at the University of East Anglia from 1994 to 1996 and at the University of Manchester 1996 to 1998. In 1998, she moved to the University of Dundee: she was promoted to senior lecturer in 2002 and to reader in philosophy in 2005. In May 2006, she joined the Open University as professor of philosophy and director of the Open University Ethics Centre.

=== Thought ===
Sophie Grace Chappell writes against the systematic ambitions of contemporary moral philosophy to be able to define "the whole and exclusive truth about the justification, explanation, evaluation, and prescription of moral beliefs, and to contain the materials for displacing or refuting most or all other systematic moral theories." Her work aligns with that of Bernard Williams, as well as Alasdair MacIntyre and Ludwig Wittgenstein.

She offers a new definition of the human personhood, inspired by gender role theory. She criticizes the traditional definition of "man" and "woman" based on antenatal biological traits, arguing that the sexual forms of human individuals can be used to identify human animals, but not human personhood. This point of view draws upon the Aristotelian definition of the human being as a political animal, as well as the Christian notion of natural moral law, at least for those aspects which might be differentiated from a gendered perspective.

Chappell introduces a distinction between passive and immediate moral perceptions vs active and step-by-step moral inferences, stating human actions are mainly performed on the basis of ethical intuitions which do not have a logical justification or did not have such a justification at the time they were enacted. Like sense perceptions, moral perceptions can be very vivid, or subjectively perceived as being certain, whilst moral inferences can be independent of their respective phenomenology or vividness. Some judgments might be considered to be moral perceptions because they appear to be "obviously true", self-evident and more certain than any rational argument with pros or cons. An example could be the following statement: "at least in nearly all conceivable cases, it is seriously wrong to torture, steal, rape and murder." In such cases, rational arguments can appear to be unnecessary.

In a 2005 paper on the Theaetetus, Chappell discusses the definition of episteme in five Platonic dialogues, arguing that Plato's work has positively identified human knowledge with judgement (in Greek: doxa) supported by a rational argument for justification (logos). As suggested above, moral perceptions may not always need a rational argument to be justified.

== Personal life ==
Chappell is transgender, and transitioned from male to female in 2014. She married in 1988, and has four children.

== Works ==
=== Nonfiction ===
- Moral perception, in Philosophy, 83 (4):421–437 (2008)
- Ethics Beyond Moral Theory, in Philosophical Investigations, 32 (3):206–243 (2009)
- Varieties of Knowledge in Plato and Aristotle, in Topoi, 31: 175–190 (2012)
- Knowing What to Do: Imagination, Virtue, and Platonism in Ethics (2014)
- Epiphanies: An Ethics of Experience (Oxford University Press, 2022)
- A Philosopher Looks at Friendship (Cambridge University Press, 2024)

=== Poetry and translations ===
- Songs for Winter Rain (Ellipsis Imprints, 2021).
- The Agamemnon of Aeschylus: A New Translation (Ellipsis Imprints, 2024)
