= Value and Context =

2006 book by Alan Thomas

Value and Context: The Nature of Moral and Political Knowledge
- Author: Alan Thomas
- Subject: Moral cognitivism
- Published: 2006, Paperback 2010
- Publisher: Oxford University Press, The Clarendon Press
- Pages: 352 pp.
- ISBN: 9780198250173

Value and Context: The Nature of Moral and Political Knowledge is a 2006 book by Alan Thomas, in which the author discusses the debate between ‘cognitivists’ and ‘non-cognitivists’ about the possibility and the nature of moral knowledge.
