= Moral luck =

Philosophical concept

Moral luck describes circumstances whereby a moral agent is assigned moral blame or praise for an action or its consequences, even if it is clear that said agent did not have full control over either the action or its consequences. This term, introduced by Bernard Williams, has been developed, along with its significance to a coherent moral theory, by Williams and Thomas Nagel in their respective essays on the subject.

== Responsibility and voluntarism ==
Broadly speaking, human beings tend to correlate, at least intuitively, responsibility and voluntary action. Thus, the most blame is assigned to persons for their actions and the consequences they entail when we have good cause to believe that both:

- the action was performed voluntarily and without outside coercion
- the agent understood the full range of the consequences of their decisions and actions, as could have reasonably been foreseen either at or prior to the time that the action was performed.

Conversely, there is a tendency to be much more sympathetic to those who satisfy any of the following conditions:

- the agent was coerced to perform the action
- the agent performed the action through accident and without any fault or negligence of their own
- at the time of their actions, the agent did not know, and had no way of knowing, the consequences that their actions would bring

Parenthetically, the above criteria do not correlate exactly with moral praise – while it may be true that one can, and should assign a good deal of moral praise to those who had performed a good action, or an action entailing good consequences, completely on their own volition and uncoerced, it is debatable that the same distinction holds for involuntary actions that happened to turn out well or happened to produce good outcomes.

This correlation between responsibility and voluntary action is acceptable to most people on an intuitive level; indeed, this correlation is echoed in American and European law: for this reason, for example, manslaughter, or killing in self-defense carries a significantly different type of legal punishment (i.e., formalized moral blame) than premeditated murder.

== The problem of moral luck ==
Given the notion of equating moral responsibility with voluntary action, however, moral luck leads to counterintuitive solutions. This is illustrated by an example of a traffic accident. Driver A, in a moment of inattention, runs a red light as a child is crossing the street. Driver A tries to avoid hitting the child but fails and the child dies. Driver B also runs a red light, but no one is crossing and only gets a traffic ticket.

If a bystander is asked to morally evaluate Drivers A and B, they may assign Driver A more moral blame than Driver B because Driver A's course of action resulted in a death. However, there are no differences in the controllable actions performed by Drivers A and B. The only disparity is an external uncontrollable event. If it is given that moral responsibility should only be relevant when the agent voluntarily performed or failed to perform some action, Drivers A and B should be blamed equally. This may be intuitively problematic, as one situation resulted in a death.

== Four types of moral luck ==
Nagel (1976) identified four kinds of moral luck in his essay. The kind most relevant to the above example is "resultant moral luck".

=== Resultant moral luck (consequential) ===
Resultant moral luck concerns the consequences of actions and situations. In the above example, both drivers were affected by resultant moral luck in that a particular set of circumstances turned out in two different ways: in one situation, a pedestrian appeared on the road; in the other, the pedestrian did not.

=== Circumstantial moral luck ===
Circumstantial moral luck concerns the surroundings of the moral agent. The best-known example is provided in Nagel's essay. Consider Nazi followers and supporters in Hitler's Germany. They were and are worthy of moral blame either for committing morally reprehensible deeds or for allowing them to occur without making efforts to oppose them. But if in 1929 those people were moved to some other country, away from the coming hostilities by their employers, it is quite possible that they would have led very different lives, and we could not assign the same amount of moral blame to them. It is down, then, to the luck of the circumstances in which they find themselves.

=== Constitutive moral luck ===
Constitutive moral luck concerns the personal character of a moral agent. There can be little argument that education, upbringing, genes and other largely uncontrollable influences shape personality to some extent. Furthermore, one's personality dictates one's actions to some extent. Moral blame is assigned to an individual for being extremely selfish, even though that selfishness is almost certainly due in part to external environmental effects.

=== Causal moral luck ===
Causal moral luck, which equates largely with the problem of free will, is the least-detailed of the varieties that Thomas Nagel describes. The general definition is that actions are determined by external events and are thus consequences of events over which the person taking the action has no control. Since people are restricted in their choice of actions by the events that precede them, they should not be held accountable or responsible for such actions.

Thomas Nagel has been criticized by Dana Nelkin for including causal moral luck as a separate category, since it appears largely redundant. It does not cover any cases that are not already included in constitutive and circumstantial luck, and seems to exist only for the purpose of bringing up the problem of free will.

== Alternatives ==
Some philosophers, such as Susan Wolf, have tried to come up with "happy mediums" that strike a balance between rejecting moral luck outright and accepting it wholesale. Wolf introduced the notions of rationalist and irrationalist positions as part of such a reconciliation.

The rationalist position, stated simply, is that equal fault deserves equal blame. For example, given two drivers, both of whom failed to check their brakes before driving, one of them runs over a pedestrian as a consequence while the other does not. The rationalist would say that since both of the drivers were equally at fault in failing to check their brakes, it should make no difference that one of them was lucky in not hitting a pedestrian while the other was unlucky – moral fault is independent of consequence. Since the fault here is equal, the agents should receive equal blame.

The consequentialist position argues that equal fault need not deserve equal blame, as blame should depend on the consequences. By this logic, the lucky driver certainly does not deserve as much blame as the unlucky driver, even though their faults were identical.

Wolf combines these two approaches in trying to reconcile the tensions associated with moral luck by introducing the concept of a virtuous agent. A virtuous agent should accept that they have a special connection with the consequences of their actions, including equal-fault cases (such as the lucky/unlucky drivers above), and even in no-fault cases. This argument essentially retains the rationalist claim that equal fault is equally deserving of blame while also retaining the consequentialist claim that different outcomes should result in moral agents feeling and acting differently.

It is important to underline the distinction between internal and external moral blame or praise. Wolf believes that the outsiders should blame the lucky and unlucky drivers equally despite their intuition that the two of them should not feel equally bad (i.e., the unlucky driver that ran over a pedestrian should feel worse). However, the unlucky driver themselves should voluntarily accept the notion of the special connection between their actions and the unfortunate consequences, and assign more blame to themselves than the lucky driver should.

== Empirical findings ==
Recent behavioral research has extended the study of moral luck into economic decision-making. Experimental work in investment contexts shows that people systematically judge identical financial decisions as less moral when they lead to negative outcomes, even though those outcomes were beyond the decision-maker's control. Participants in these studies not only evaluated unprofitable investments more harshly but also reinterpreted their nature, relabeling them as "speculation" or "gambling" rather than "investment" after learning of a loss. These results suggest that outcome-dependent moral evaluation in lay reasoning is robust and conscious, supporting the relevance of moral luck in practical economic judgments.

== See also ==
- Determinism
- List of cognitive biases
  - Just-world fallacy
