= Vita Gollancz =

British artist (1926–2009)

Vita V. Gollancz (28 January 1926 – 8 October 2009) was a British painter, printmaker, illustrator and draughtsman.

== Life and work ==
Born in 1926, Vita Gollancz was the fourth daughter of noted publisher Victor Gollancz, and his wife Ruth (née Lowy), an artist who had studied at the Slade School of Art under Henry Tonks. Painting and drawing featured prominently in Vita's early life, not only from the influence of her mother, but from the many established art luminaries that visited their home. Vita read Modern History at Girton College, Cambridge, becoming the Sparke History Scholar and also the Chairman of the Cambridge University Labour Club. After graduating she worked from 1952 to 1962 as manager of Sir Hugh Casson's architectural practice, and subsequently as Assistant and draughtswoman for Sir Basil Spence from 1964 to 1971. She then returned to painting in her thirties, first studying at Chelsea School of Art and at Byam Shaw and the City and Guilds Schools of Art. She studied etching with Henry Williamson.

Among the many exhibitions which have included her work have been the New English Art Club, the Royal Society of British Artists and the Royal Academy Summer Exhibitions. A solo exhibition at the Annexe Gallery was followed by regular studio shows.

In the late 1960s Vita regularly went with a group of artists led by Peter Garrard to paint in the Midi, near Uzes. In the 1980s she travelled around the Mediterranean, painting Crete and the Greek Islands - her works from this period are almost abstract. John Kenworthy-Browne commented that "her landscape paintings bring to mind an elusive concept of Constable's, the Chiaroscuro of nature... that power which creates space."

In 1980, Vita Gollancz was elected to Associate Member status of the Royal Society of British Artists.

Vita's sister, Livia Ruth Gollancz, is a noted musician who later became controlling director of Victor Gollancz Ltd, on the death of their father. Both sisters contributed to their father's 1968 autobiography, Reminiscences of Affection; Vita provided illustrations, while Livia penned the foreword.

== Exhibitions ==
Works exhibited at the Royal Academy, London.

- 1968 – Back Gardens
- 1969 – Landscape in August: Gard.
- 1978 – Surviving Elms, Gloucestershire
- 1980 – Black Hill from Clunbury
- 1987 – Fields near Wyck, Hampshire

Various group shows:

- 1967 – New English Art Club
- 1968 – New English Art Club
- 1969 – New English Art Club
- 1970 – New English Art Club
- 1970 – The Kensington and Chelsea Artists
- 1975 – The Kensington and Chelsea Artists
- 1976 – New English Art Club
- 1976 – The Kensington and Chelsea Artists
- 1976 – Artistes de Grande Bretagne, Bilan de l'Art Contemporain, Paris
- 1977 – New English Art Club
- 1978 – New English Art Club
- 1979 – New English Art Club
- 1980 – New English Art Club
- 1979 – Artistes de Grande Bretagne, Paris
- 1980 – 20th Century Oils, Clarges Gallery, London
- 1980 – Southover Gallery, Lewes

Solo shows:

- 1981 – The Annexe Gallery, Wimbledon, London
- 1983 – Haldane Road Studio, London
- 1985 – Haldane Road Studio, London
- 2006 – Vita Gollancz: 80th Birthday Exhibition, Piers Feetham Gallery, London.

== Sources ==
- Royal Academy Exhibitors 1905-1970, Vol III (EP Publishing LTD, 1979)
- Royal Academy Exhibitors 1971-1989, (Hilmarton Manor Press, 1989)
