= Alan Thomas (philosopher) =

British philosopher (born 1964)

- Born: 1964 (age 61–62); Shrewsbury, UK
- Spouse: Kathryn Brown
- Awards: Kennedy Scholar 1987–88

Education
- Education: King's College, Cambridge (1984–1987); University of Oxford (D.Phil.)
- Thesis: A contextual model of moral justification (1995)
- Doctoral advisor: Bernard Williams

Philosophical work
- Era: 21st-century philosophy
- Region: Western philosophy
- Institutions: King’s College, London (1993-1998); University of Kent; Tilburg University (2010-2016); University of York (2016-)
- Main interests: moral philosophy, political philosophy
- Website: https://ethics-socialphilosophy.com/ https://alanthomas.academia.edu https://uk.linkedin.com/in/alan-thomas-51110a76

Alan Thomas (born 1964) is a British philosopher in the Department of Philosophy at the University of York. He is best known for his works on ethics and political philosophy.

== Career ==
Thomas was educated at the Graig Comprehensive School, Llanelli, before undergraduate study at King's College, Cambridge. Following a year at Harvard University as a Kennedy Scholar, Thomas returned to Oxford University to complete his doctorate under the supervision of Bernard Williams. Thomas began his career at King's College London before taking up a lectureship at the University of Kent at Canterbury. Thomas became a professor of ethics at Tilburg University in 2010 before becoming a professor of philosophy at the University of York in 2016. He has been a visiting scholar at the University of British Columbia (2007–2008), a fellow of the Murphy Institute at Tulane University (2009–10), a visiting fellow of the Humanities Research Centre at the Australian National University (2015) and a visiting professor at St. Louis University (2015). His research has been funded by the AHRC (2001) and the Templeton Foundation (2015, 2016–18). In 2019 Thomas was funded by the UK's Independent Social Research Foundation for work on the regulation of the financial sector. He is currently part of a multi-department (Philosophy, Computing, Law) and multi-university research team working on the UKRI (EPSRC) funded project on the resilience of autonomous systems.

== Books ==
- Extravagance and Misery: the Emotional Regime of Market Societies, co-authored with Alfred Archer and Bart Engelen, Oxford University Press, 2024 November.
- Bernard Williams, Cambridge 'Elements' Series, Cambridge University Press, 2024.
- Republic of Equals: Predistribution and Property-Owning Democracy, Oxford University Press, 2017
- Thomas Nagel, Routledge, 2015
- Bernard Williams (editor and contributor), Cambridge University Press, 2007
- Value and Context: the Nature of Moral and Political Knowledge, The Clarendon Press, 2006
