= Republic of Equals =

2017 book by Alan Thomas

Republic of Equals: Predistribution and Property-Owning Democracy
- Author: Alan Thomas
- Subject: political philosophy
- Published: 2016
- Publisher: Oxford University Press
- Pages: 472 pp.
- ISBN: 9780190602116

Republic of Equals: Predistribution and Property-Owning Democracy is a book-length study of property-owning democracy by Alan Thomas in which the author argues that a society in which capital is universally accessible to all citizens uniquely meets the demands of justice.
