= Ben's Cookies =

British confectionery shop chain

Coordinates: 51°45′10″N 1°15′24″W

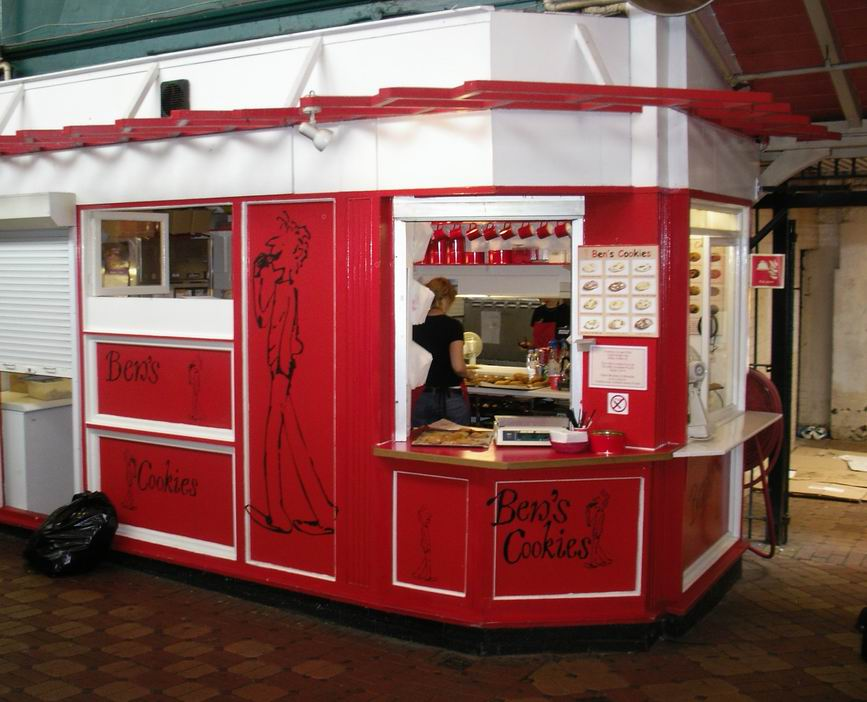
Ben's Cookies in Oxford's covered market

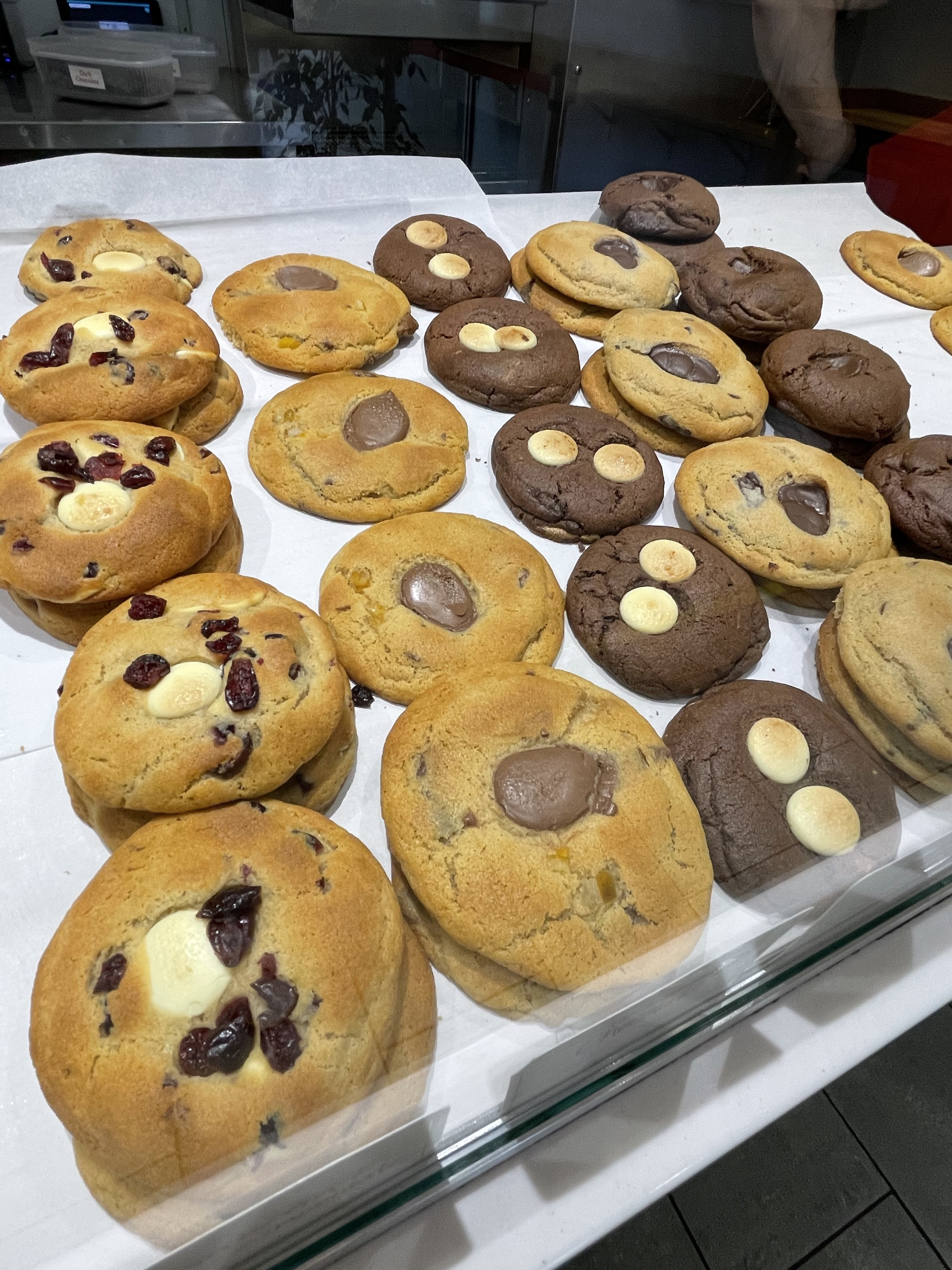
Cookie display at a London branch

Ben's Cookies is an international chain of shops that bake and sell cookies. After making cookies at home, Helge Rubinstein opened a stall to sell them in Oxford's Covered Market in 1984. The cookies can usually be purchased warm as they are baked on-site in the shops. The first store was in Oxford's covered market. The stores are mainly in London, but also in other UK cities and other countries.

Rubinstein was a graduate of Somerville College, Oxford and wife of Hilary Rubinstein. The company was named after Rubinstein's son Ben, and the logo was created by the British artist Quentin Blake, a friend of the family.

Ben's Cookies currently has numerous stores in the United Kingdom, including Bath, Bristol, Cambridge, Edinburgh, London, and Reading. It has also opened stores overseas in Singapore, South Korea, Japan, Saudi Arabia, UAE, Kuwait, Bahrain, Malaysia, Bangkok, Manila, and Dallas.

== See also ==
- Media related to Ben's Cookies at Wikimedia Commons
