= Ruth Gollancz =

Ruth, Lady Gollancz (née Lowy; 1892–1973) was a British artist and wife of Sir Victor Gollancz.

== Life and work ==
Ruth was the daughter of Ernest Daniel Lowy, a stockbroker. Ruth Gollancz studied art at the Slade School of Art from 1909 to 1912 under the direction of Henry Tonks. Her contemporaries at the Slade included C.R.W. Nevinson, Paul Nash, John Nash, Stanley Spencer, Mark Gertler and Gwen Raverat amongst others. At this time she was also an active suffragette. She left the Slade school to undertake war work before going on to become one of the first female students at the Architectural Association in 1917 and a fully qualified architect.

Ruth married Victor Gollancz in 1919. The couple had five daughters including the artist Vita Gollancz and the musician Livia Ruth Gollancz.

== Exhibitions ==
- 1933 – Cooling & Sons Gallery
- 1964 – Upper Grosvenor Galleries
