= Livia Gollancz =

- Livia Ruth Gollancz in 1990, by Anne-Katrin Purkiss

Background information
- Born: Livia Ruth Gollancz; 25 May 1920; London, United Kingdom
- Died: 29 March 2018 (aged 97) London, United Kingdom
- Genre: Classical
- Occupations: Musician, publisher
- Instrument: French Horn
- Years active: 1935–52 (as performer), 1953–89 (at the Victor Gollancz Ltd. publishing house)

Livia Ruth Gollancz (25 May 1920 − 29 March 2018) was a British publisher and musician who was the first female principal horn of a major UK symphony orchestra.

== Early life and education ==
Livia Ruth Gollancz was born in London on 25 May 1920. Gollancz was the eldest child of the artist and architect Ruth Gollancz (née Löwy) and the publisher Victor Gollancz. Livia was the eldest of five sisters. She and her siblings, Diana, Julia, the artist Vita Gollancz and Francesca were the dedicatees of the 1932 "An Outline For Boys And Girls And Their Parents." She was of Jewish descent.

Her schooling took place at Kensington High School (now Kensington Preparatory School) and St Paul's Girls' School. Her early musical education had included learning the clarinet though she was more successful as a pianist and violinist later changing to the viola. In order to ensure that Gollancz did not leave school without having completed her school certificate her mother offered her extra maths tuition necessary to pass her exams in return for a French horn.

In 1936, Gollancz was initially accepted to study at the Royal College of Music as a first study viola player and with Frank Probyn as a second study French horn player though after 18 months she switched to first study French horn.

== Musical career ==
Following her studies, Gollancz joined The Queen's Hall Light Orchestra. Other engagements included deputy 2nd horn for the Scottish Orchestra (now Royal Scottish National Orchestra), 1940–41, 4th horn for The BBC Theatre Orchestra, 1942–43, and 3rd horn with the London Symphony Orchestra in 1941. During her performing career she freelanced with many theatre and concert orchestras including The Old Vic Company and the Royal Opera House.

The conductor and founder of The Proms Henry Wood heard Gollancz performing with the London Symphony Orchestra in May 1941 and was prompted to write to her the following day:

"Dear Miss Gollancz, A year or two ago your father told me you were studying the horn and at yesterday's concert I had the pleasure of seeing you, particularly in the Brahms Second Piano Concerto. May I offer you my warmest congratulations, your tone and phrasing in the solo passages allotted to the third horn rang out splendidly in the body of the hall – a real achievement for a woman artist – Bravo. Sincerely yours, Henry J. Wood."

In 1941, the first year of the Proms being held at the Royal Albert Hall, Gollancz was engaged as 4th horn with the London Symphony Orchestra conducted by Henry Wood for a concert of Beethoven's Ninth Symphony, performing the famous solo written for that chair.

In June 1943, Gollancz was appointed principal horn of Sir John Barbirolli's Hallé Orchestra making her the first female principal horn of a UK orchestra. Her section comprise herself, Jimmy Dennis, Enid Roper and Raymond Meert.

When Barbirolli became conductor of the Hallé Orchestra in 1943, he chose Livia as principal horn. She admired his insistence that female musicians should be treated on their musical merits, but after two years they parted company when she told him his approach to classical music was “too romantic for my taste,” an opinion she later regretted as the “audacity and stupidity of youth.” She then joined the Scottish Orchestra (1943–45, now the Royal Scottish National Orchestra), and the BBC Scottish Orchestra (1945–46, now the BBC Scottish Symphony Orchestra).

In 1945, Gollancz resigned from the Hallé due to her judging Barbirolli's approach to classical music as "too romantic for my taste." She subsequently joined the Scottish Orchestra (now Royal Scottish National Orchestra) followed by The BBC Scottish Symphony Orchestra as principal horn. In 1947 she returned to London as principal horn of The Royal Opera House; however here she was faced with working with Karl Rankl who, resistant to female musicians being engaged, refused to work with her.

From 1950 to 1952 Gollancz was principal horn of the Sadler's Wells Opera and in 1952 she was principal horn for the Ballets Russes.

== Publishing career ==
In the early 1950s, Gollancz developed dental problems which ultimately shortened her performing career. Therefore, in 1953 she took up her father's invitation and joined Victor Gollancz Ltd. Gollancz worked her way up through the firm, from making coffee, to writing cover copy and eventually to editing. Her father nurtured her career and when he suffered a stroke in 1966, Gollancz stepped into the role of managing director.

The Gollancz music list was expanded under her leadership and, reflecting another of her personal interests, the company significantly extended its range of mountaineering titles. Gollancz personally saw all the mountaineering related titles through from start to finish, she commissioned the translation of autobiographies by several leading European mountaineers including Walter Bonatti, Pierre Mazeaud, and Anderl Heckmair and she published Chris Bonington's first book after having met him whilst fell-walking.

Gollancz was chairman of the company 1983 until 1989, when Victor Gollancz Ltd was sold to Houghton Mifflin (which then sold Gollancz to Cassell three years later). Livia shared part of the proceeds from the sale to Houghton Mifflin with everyone who worked at Gollancz.
