= 19th-century French art =

Art made in France during the 19th century

19th-century French art was made in France or by French citizens during the following political regimes: Napoleon's Consulate (1799–1804) and Empire (1804–14), the Restoration (1814–30), the July Monarchy (1830–48), the Second Republic (1848–52), the Second Empire (1852–71), and the first decades of the Third Republic (1871–1940).

Romanticism emerged in the early 19th century as a vibrant period in the arts, influenced by the French Revolution and Napoleonic wars. It marked a departure from classicism, embracing Orientalism, tragic anti-heroes, wild landscapes, and themes from the Middle Ages and the Renaissance. This era saw a debate between the proponents of line, exemplified by Jean Auguste Dominique Ingres, and those favoring violent colors and curves, like Eugène Delacroix. Romanticism emphasized a literary language rooted in feelings. It laid the groundwork for later movements, including Naturalism and Symbolism, influencing artists like Gustave Courbet, the Barbizon School, and Gustave Moreau.

The birth of Modernism in the late 19th century, centered in Paris, was marked by artistic innovation across domains including music, dance, architecture, and literature. It was characterized by the dynamism of café culture, the impact of Haussmannization on the cityscape, and a blend of social classes and radical art movements. Édouard Manet's work bridged 19th-century art with modernism, leading the way to Impressionism. Claude Monet and his contemporaries advanced this movement by capturing transient light effects outdoors, inspired partly by J.M.W. Turner and the advent of paint in tubes.

Impressionism set the stage for further experimentation. Vincent van Gogh introduced expressionism; Georges Seurat developed pointillism; Paul Cézanne explored geometric perceptions; Paul Gauguin sought symbolism and primitivism in exotic locales; and Henri Rousseau exemplified naïve art. This era of artistic exploration laid the foundations for many modern art movements, reflecting a continuous dialogue between past traditions and innovative techniques, including the emerging influence of photography. Many of the developments in French arts in this period parallel changes in 19th-century French literature.

== Romanticism ==
The French Revolution and the Napoleonic Wars brought great changes to the arts in France. The program of exaltation and mythification of the Emperor Napoleon I of France was closely coordinated in the paintings of Gros and Guérin.

Meanwhile, Orientalism, Egyptian motifs, the tragic anti-hero, the wild landscape, the historical novel and scenes from the Middle Ages and the Renaissance, all these elements of Romanticism created a vibrant period that defies classicism.

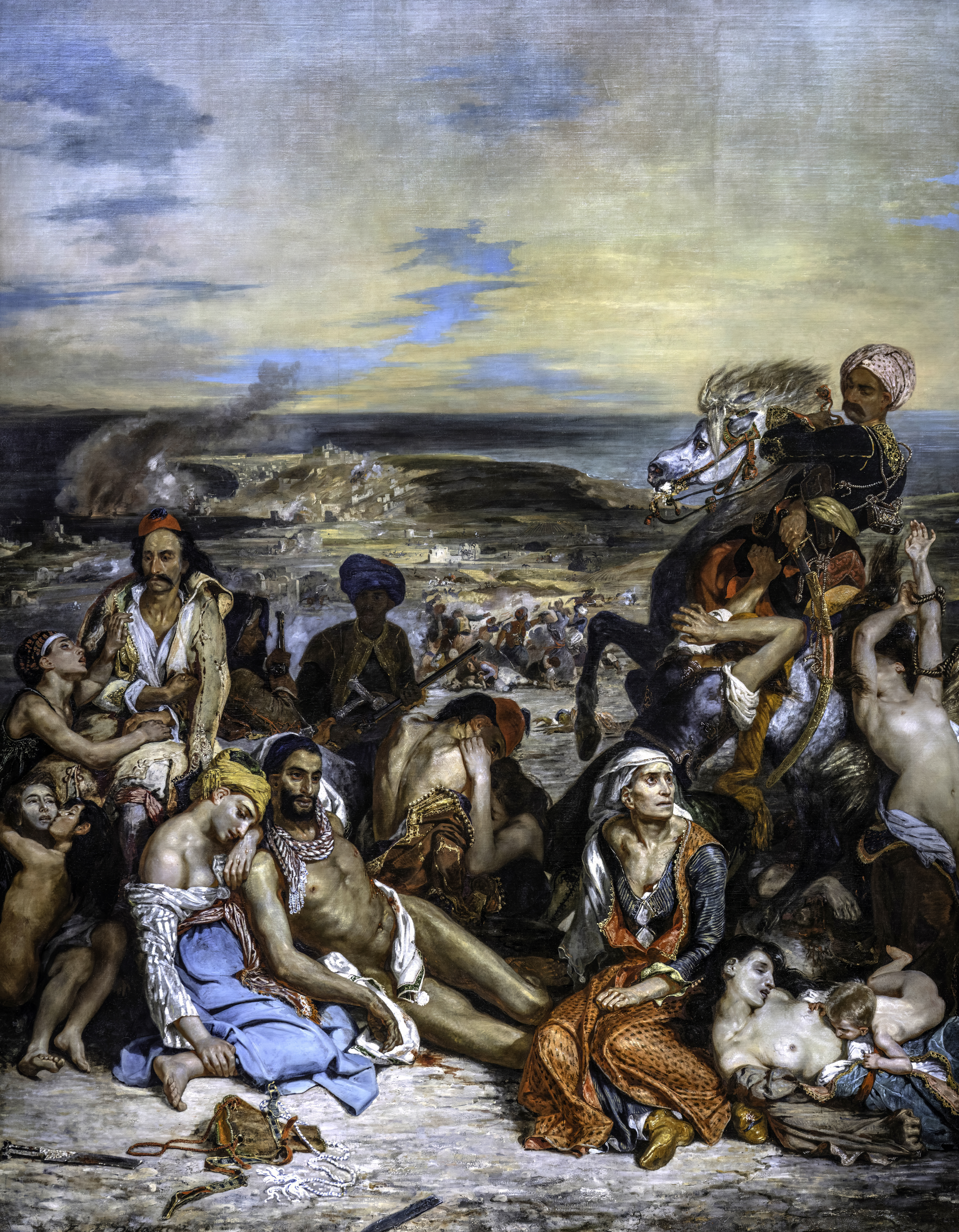
The Massacre at Chios (Scène des massacres de Scio), Eugène Delacroix, 1824

One also finds in the early period of the 19th century a repeat of the debate carried on in the 17th between the supporters of Rubens and Poussin: there are defenders of the "line" as found in Jean Auguste Dominique Ingres, and the violent colors and curves as found in Eugène Delacroix. The comparison is however somewhat false, for Ingres' intense realism sometimes gives way to amazing voluptuousness in his orientalised bath scenes.

Romanticism is a literary language based on feelings. Writers who illustrated this concept included John Keats and Benjamin Constant. The Romantic tendencies continued throughout the century: both idealized landscape painting and Naturalism have their seeds in Romanticism: both Gustave Courbet and the Barbizon school are logical developments, as is too the late 19th century Symbolism of such painters at Gustave Moreau (the professor of Matisse and Rouault) or Odilon Redon. Auguste Rodin and Camille Claudel are the most famous sculptors of their time.

== Birth of Modernism ==
Walter Benjamin called Paris "the capital of the 19th century". In order to understand the amazing diversity of artistic expressions which Paris gave birth to from the 1860s to all nightboulevards, but also replaced poorer neighborhoods and created fast routes to move troops through the city to quell unrest. Yet there was also a second Paris at the limits of Haussmann's city on the hill of Montmartre with her windmills, cabarets and vineyards. Café culture, cabarets, arcades (19th century covered malls), anarchism, the mixing of classes, the radicalization of art and artistic movements caused by the academic salon system, a boisterous willingness to shock — all this made for a stunning vibrancy. What is more, the dynamic debate in the visual arts is also repeated in the same period in music, dance, architecture and the novel: Schoenberg, Stravinsky, Proust, Nijinski, etc. This is the birth of Modernism.

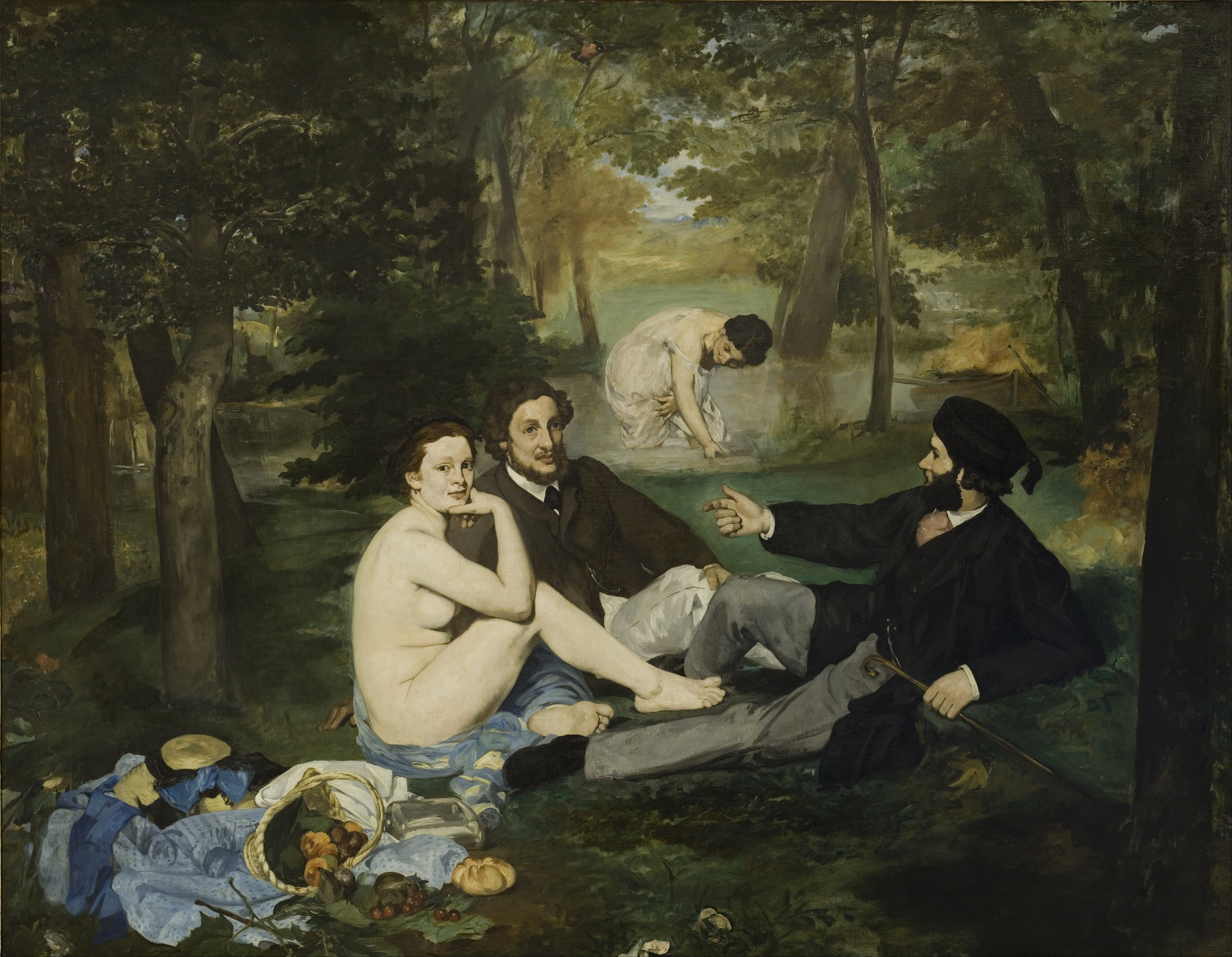
The Luncheon on the Grass (Le déjeuner sur l'herbe), Édouard Manet, 1863

Édouard Manet represents for many critics the division between the 19th century and the modern period (much like Charles Baudelaire in poetry). His rediscovery of Spanish painting from the golden age, his willingness to show the unpainted canvas, his exploration of the forthright nude and his radical brush strokes are the first step toward Impressionism.

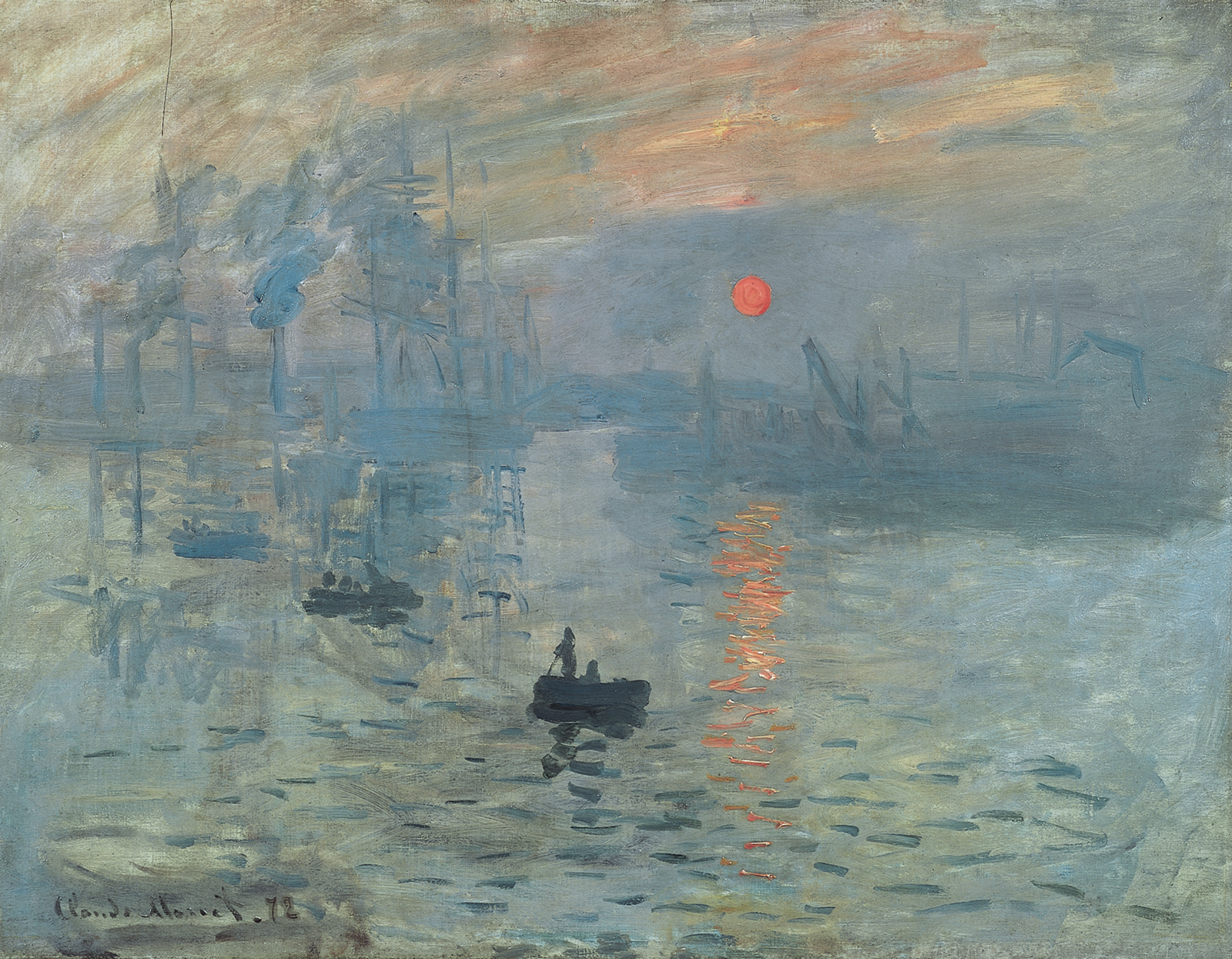
Impression, Sunrise (Impression, soleil levant), Claude Monet, 1872

Impressionism would take the Barbizon school one further, rejecting once and for all a belabored style (and the use of mixed colors and black), for fragile transitive effects of light as captured outdoors in changing light (in part inspired by the paintings of J. M. W. Turner). Claude Monet with his cathedrals and haystacks, Pierre-Auguste Renoir with both his early outdoor festivals and his later feathery style of ruddy nudes, Edgar Degas with his dancers and bathers.

Some of these techniques were made possible by new paints available in tubes. These painters were also to a certain degree in a dialogue with another discovery of the 19th century: photography.

From this point on, the next thirty years were a litany of amazing experiments. Vincent van Gogh, Dutch born but living in France, opened the road to expressionism. Georges Seurat, influenced by color theory, devised a pointillist technique that controlled the Impressionist experiment. Paul Cézanne, a painter's painter, attempted a geometrical exploration of the world (that left many of his peers indifferent). Paul Gauguin, the banker, found symbolism in Brittany and then exoticism and primitivism in French Polynesia. Henri Rousseau, the self-taught dabbler, becomes the model for the naïve revolution.

== See also ==
- List of French artists of the first half of the 19th century
- List of French artists of the second half of the 19th century
- Félix Louis Leullier
- Incoherents

== Sources ==
- Stevens, Mary Anne; Nichols, Lawrence W., eds. (2012). Manet: Portraying Life. Toledo: Toledo Museum of Art. p. 199. ISBN 978-1907533532.
