= Nemacheilus inglisi =

Conservation status
- Vulnerable (IUCN 3.1)

Scientific classification
- Kingdom: Animalia
- Phylum: Chordata
- Class: Actinopterygii
- Order: Cypriniformes
- Family: Nemacheilidae
- Genus: Nemacheilus
- Species: N. inglisi

Binomial name
- Nemacheilus inglisi Hora, 1935

Synonyms
- Nemachilus rupecola inglisi Hora, 1935; Schistura inglisi (Hora, 1935); Schistura rupecula inglisi (Hora, 1935)

Species of fish

Nemacheilus inglisi is a species of ray-finned fish in the genus Nemacheilus from rivers below Darjeeling and Sikkim, eastern Himalayas, in India.

It is named in honour of Charles M. Inglis (1870–1954), Scottish naturalist and Curator of the Natural History Museum of Darjeeling, India.
