= Charles Inglis =

Charles Inglis may refer to:

- Charles Inglis (Royal Navy officer, died 1791) (c. 1731–1791)
- Charles Inglis (Royal Navy officer, died 1833), son of the above
- Charles Inglis (bishop) (1734–1816), Anglican clergyman, first Church of England bishop of Nova Scotia
- Charles Inglis (engineer) (1875–1952), civil engineer
- Charles M. Inglis (1870-1954), naturalist and curator of the Darjeeling museum in India
- Charles A. Inglis, alias used by German spy Carl Hans Lody
