= Tamil Encyclopedia =

Kalaikkalanjiam (Tamil: Encyclopedia) is a universal encyclopaedia in Tamil, published by the Tamil Development Academy, Chennai. The project was funded by the Union Government of India, the State Government of then Madras Presidency and many Tamil well wishers. The Tamil Development Academy announced its intent to produce this encyclopaedia on the day of Indian Independence 15 August 1947. The work started in the academy's Madras University Campus on 20 October 1947. The chief editor of this effort was Periyasaamy Thooran.

== Contents ==
The first volume was released in 1954 and the tenth and final volume was released in 1968.

Volume 1 – 1954 – 742 pages
Volume 2 – 1955 – 760 pages
Volume 3 – 1956 – 756 pages
Volume 4 – 1956 – 778 pages
Volume 5 – 1958 – 750 pages
Volume 6 – 1959 – 770 pages
Volume 7 – 1960 – 754 pages
Volume 8 – 1961 – 758 pages
Volume 9 – 1963 – 751 pages
Volume 10 – 1968 – 560 pages

== Contributors ==
Following groups were involved in producing these volumes:

- Executive groups 5, Total members 74
- Content groups 21, Total members 132
- Research groups 27, Total members 66
- Glossary group 1, Total members 40

In total, 2240 scholars have contributed to various articles in these 10 volumes.

A second revised edition for this encyclopaedia was planned with 12 volumes of 1000 pages each. But the plan did not materialise due to various reasons.

The entire Kalaikkalanjiam is available online at the Tamil Virtual Academy website.

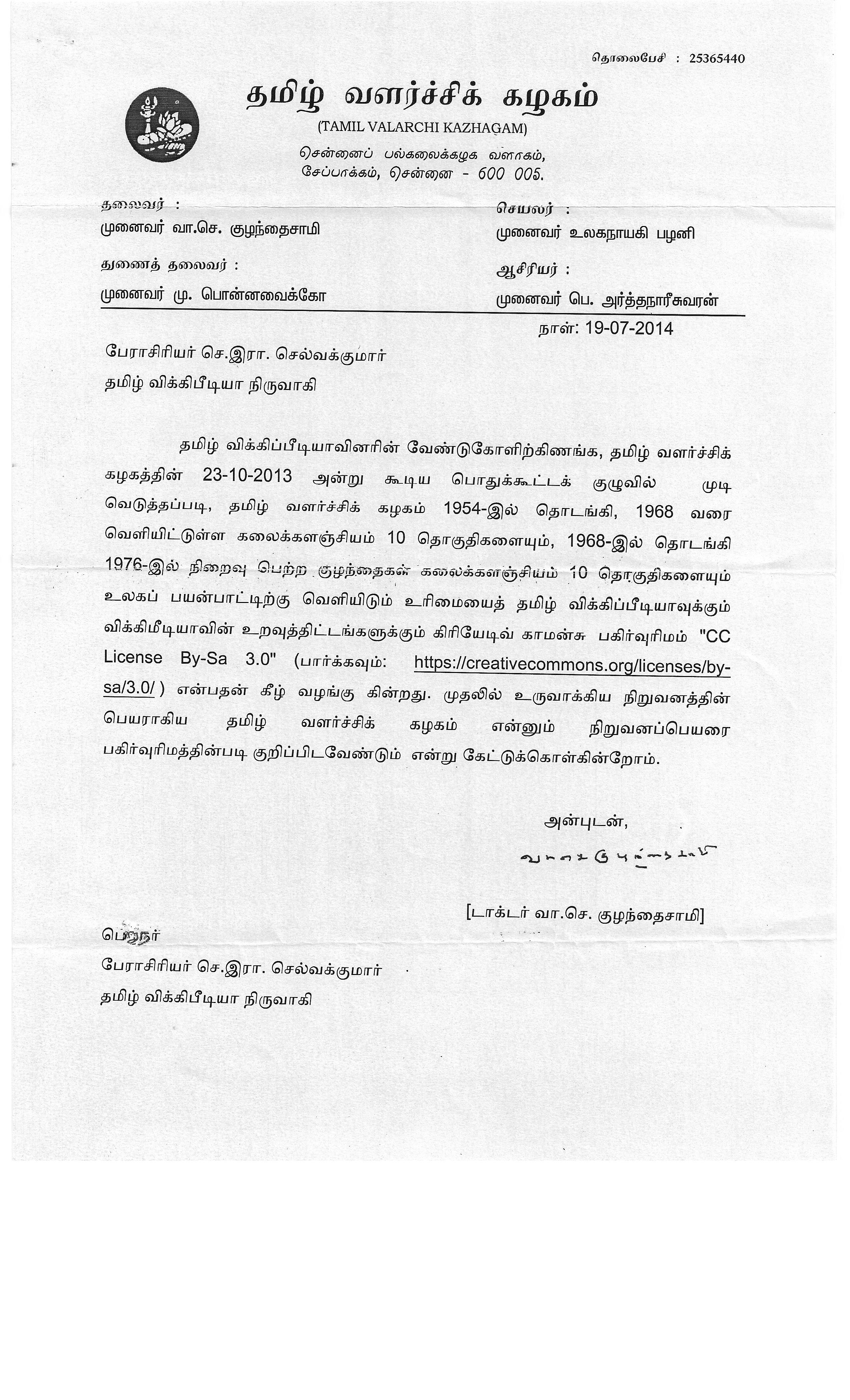
Tamil Development Academy donating 20 volumes of encyclopaedia in Tamil under Creative Commons licence

In 2014, Tamil Development Academy donated all 10 volumes under Creative Commons Share-Alike 3.0 licence based on Tamil Wikipedia contributors' request. Along with this, 10 volumes of Kuzhandhaigal Kalaikkalanjiam was also released under Creative Commons licence.

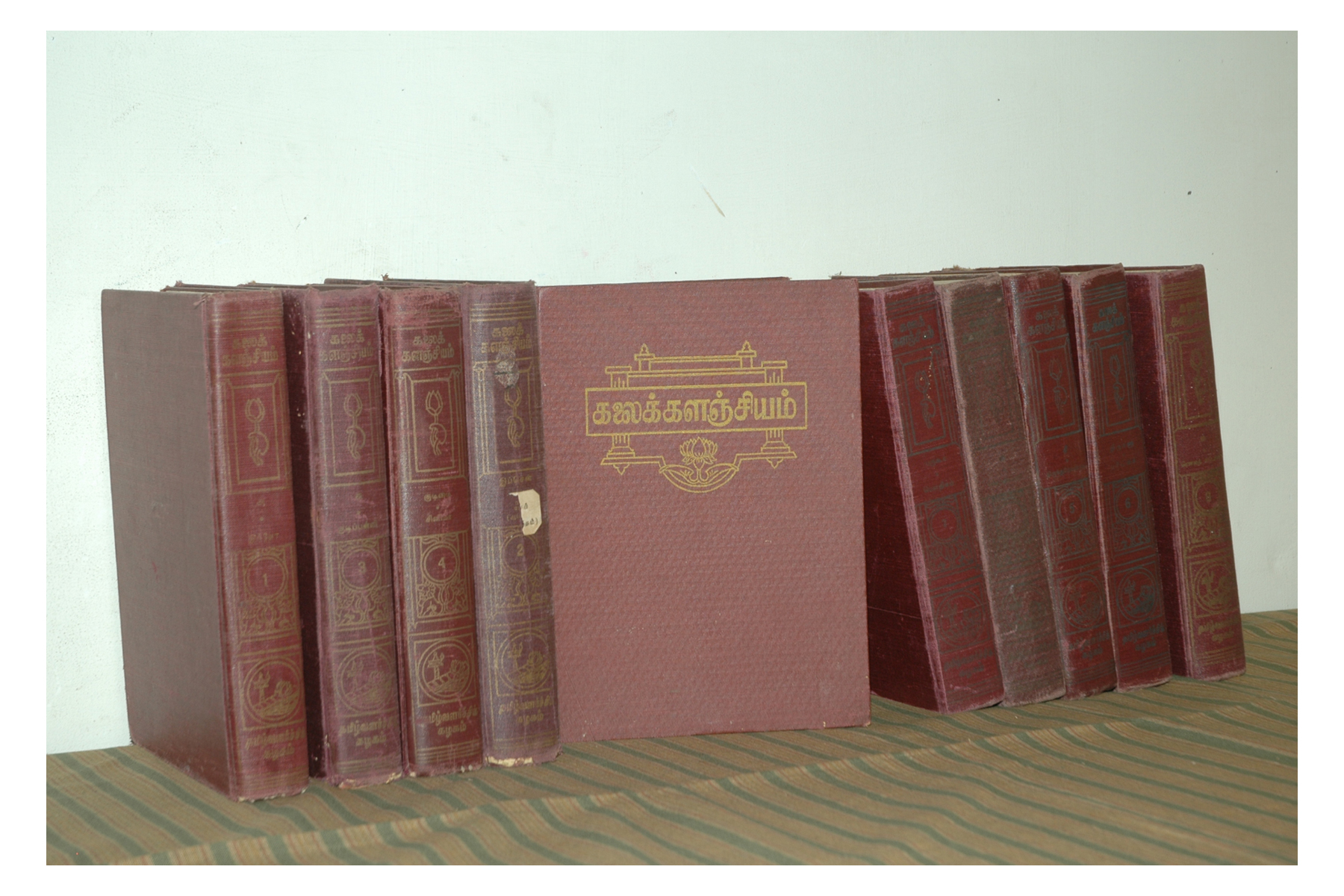
Tamil Encyclopedia 10 Volume set (7500 pages)

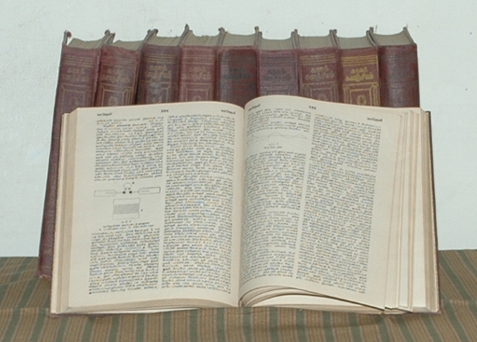
Tamil Encyclopedia (sample detail)

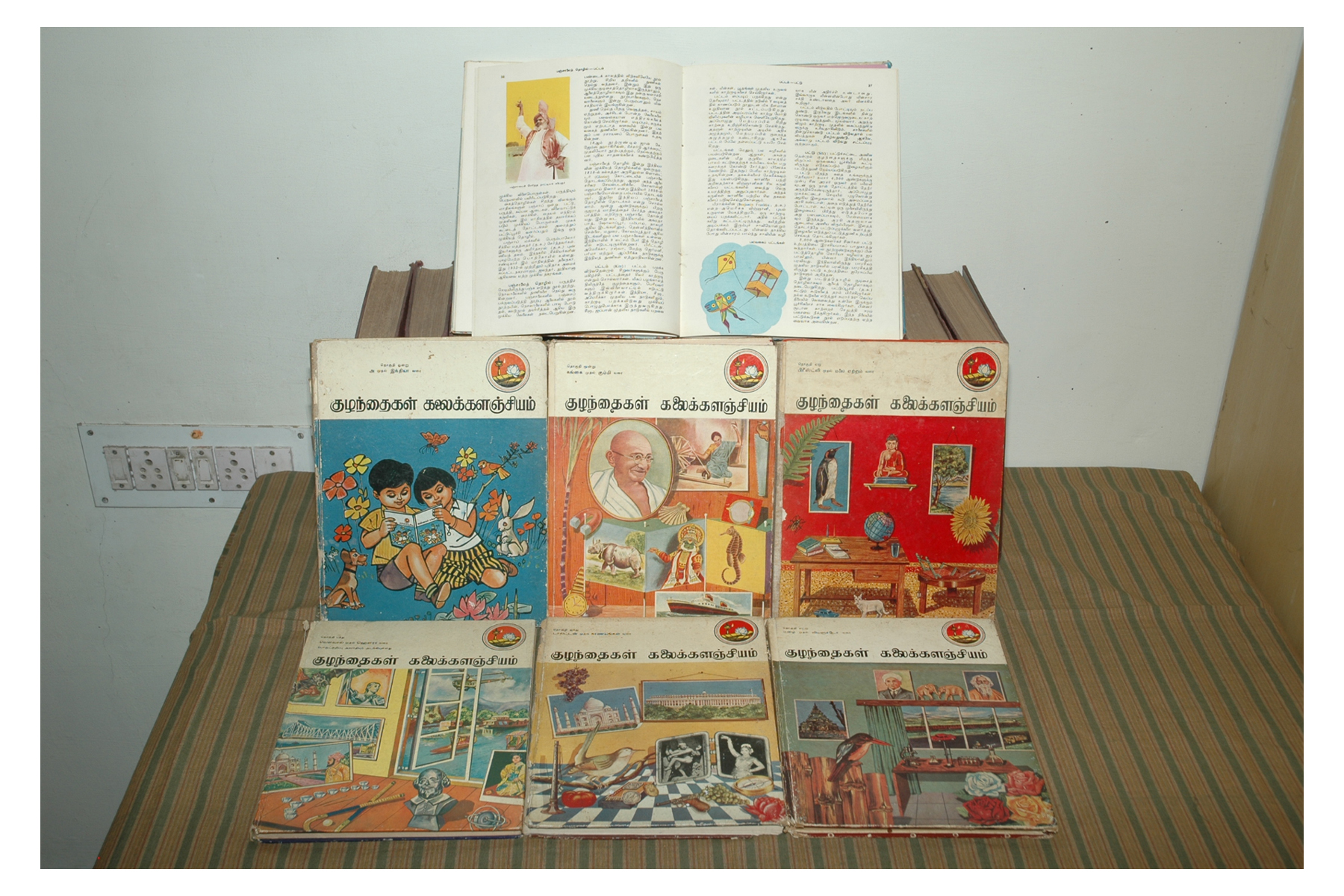
Tamil Encyclopedia for Children

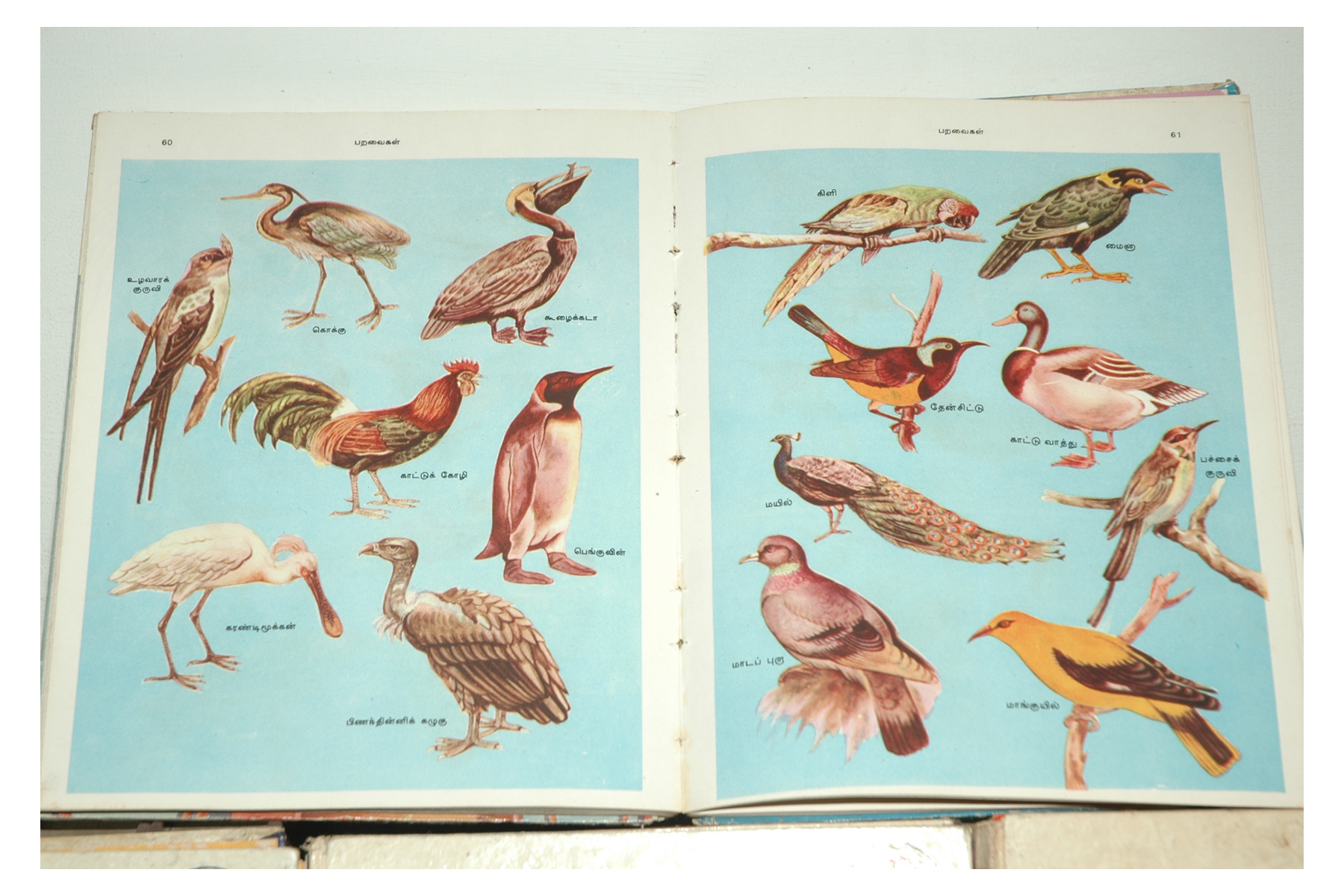
Children's Tamil Encyclopedia (sample detail)
