= Jamal Ara =

Indian bird biologist, researcher

Jamal Ara (1923–1995) was a noted Indian ornithologist and naturalist known for her extensive field and scientific observations of birds in the Chota Nagpur Plateau, Jharkhand, India. She has been called India's first "birdwoman".

== Life and work ==
Ara was born in Barh, Patna District, Bihar, in 1923, and raised in Bihar in the family of a police officer. She studied formally up to the 10th standard. She married a journalist, Hamdi Bey, who was based in Calcutta. After their marriage broke down, she and her daughter, Madhuca, were taken care of by Sami Ahmad, a cousin and an Indian Forest Service (IFS) officer (1940 Bihar cadre) at his official residence in Ranchi. Ara was based in Doranda, Ranchi, for the rest of her life.

Through accompanying Ahmad on field trips, Ara became interested in nature and the forests. The wife of another IFS officer, PW Augier, encouraged Ara to keep detailed notes of her birding observations, and to write articles. She jouned the Bengal Natural History Society, and was encouraged to study the birds of Darbhanga by C.M. Inglis who had retired to Coonoor but corresponded with her and provided his notes. From 1949, Ara published over 60 articles in the journals of the Bombay Natural History Society, Bengal Natural History Society, and the Newsletter for Birdwatchers, about birds and about other wildlife and conservation in Bihar. Her first paper, published in the Journal of the Bombay Natural History Society in 1949, concerned the wildlife reserves of Bihar. A 1999 paper on the growth of ornithology in India noted that some of her articles were still "the only source material on birds of remote valleys and mountains in the state of Bihar". She also wrote a children's book, "Watching Birds", published by the National Book Trust in 1970, which is still in print as of 2024, and was translated into several regional languages of India. As well as her writings on birds, she gave talks on All India Radio about birds and other wildlife of Bihar, and advocated for nature reserves by writing letters to newspapers and presenting a report on vanishing Indian big game to the conference held by the International Union for the Protection of Nature held at Lake Success, New York in 1949. She also wrote short stories herself, and translated works by Kartar Singh Duggal from Punjabi into English. Her papers at the Archives at the National Centre for Biological Sciences indicate other draft writings in Urdu and English on a variety of topics, including archaeology and the intersection of nature and indigenous communities in the Chota Nagpur plateau, and a manuscript on birds of Bihar, with her own hand-drawn illustrations.

Ara stopped writing in 1988, and died in 1995 aged 71.

== Selected publications ==
- Ara, Jamal (1970). Watching Birds. National Book Trust, India.
- Periyasaamy_Thooran translated 'Watching Birds' into Tamil which has been nationalized. Ara, Jamal (1970). Paravaigalai Paar (PDF). National Book Trust, India.
