= Rory Nugent =

American explorer and writer (born 1952)

Rory Nugent (born 1952) is an American explorer and writer. He was based out of New Bedford, Massachusetts from 1988 to 2004.

== Biography ==
Nugent was born in New York 1952. He attended Canterbury School in New Milford, Connecticut. After he graduated from Williams College in 1975, he went to sea aboard freighters and canvas-fliers. He sailed solo across the Atlantic Ocean four times. His fifth crossing ended prematurely when the catamaran he was sailing capsized; he was rescued five days later.

In 1992, Nugent became a foreign correspondent, first for Men's Journal and then as a staff member of Spin. He left journalism in 2002 to work on his third book.

== Cryptozoology ==
In the mid-1980s, Nugent mounted solo expeditions in search of the pink-headed duck on the Brahmaputra River and Mokele-mbembe in the Congo. It is alleged that he may have seen both, but his sightings remain unconfirmed. He wrote a non-fiction book about each expedition.

Nugent's alleged Mokele-mbembe photographs from 1985 have been criticized as unreliable. One was described as a distant snapshot of a log floating in a lake.

== Bibliography ==
=== Books ===
- The Search for the Pink-Headed Duck (Houghton Mifflin, 1991)
- Drums Along The Congo: On The Trail Of Mokele-Mbembe, the Last Living Dinosaur (Houghton Mifflin, 1993)
- Down at the Docks (Pantheon Books, 2009)

=== Articles ===
- Nugent, Rory (June 2009). "Hope floats". The Atlantic. 303 (5): 62–63. MS Oasis of the Seas
