= Periyasaamy Thooran =

Indian poet, teacher and composer (1908–1987)

Periasamy Thooran
- Born: 26 September 1908; Manjakattuvalasu, composite Coimbatore District, Madras Presidency, British India (now in Erode district, Tamil Nadu, India)
- Died: 20 January 1987 (aged 78); Madras (now Chennai), Tamil Nadu, India
- Other name: Thooran
- Education: Presidency College, Chennai
- Known for: Tamil Literature, Carnatic Music, Tamil Encyclopedia
- Spouse: Kaliammal
- Children: 4

Manjakattuvalasu Palanivelappa Gounder Periyasaamy Thooran (26 September 1908 – 20 January 1987) popularly known as Periyasaamy Thooran was an Indian patriot, Tamil poet, teacher, and composer of Carnatic music. He was the chief editor of the Tamil Encyclopedia project called 'Kalaikkalanjiam' in Tamil language.

== Early life ==
Periyasamy was born to K. A. Palanivelappa Gounder and Paavaathal on 26 September 1908 at Manjakattuvalasu, near Modakurichi in present-day Erode district, Tamil Nadu, India. He was greatly influenced and inspired by the firebrand poet and revolutionary Subramania Bharathiyar, and Mahatma Gandhi. As a university student, he published an underground monthly magazine called Pithan, containing incendiary articles against the erstwhile British administration, and in support of the Indian Independence Movement. This magazine was printed by K. M. Ramaswamy Gounder MLA in Gobichettipalayam initially. He also wrote poems and short stories during this period, adopting the pen name Thooran. He declined to sit for the final Bachelor of Arts examination, in protest of the execution of Bhagat Singh. Periyasamy gained his Bachelor of Arts degree (in Mathematics with a Minor in Astronomy) and a L.T. (Licentiate in Teaching) later. Periyasamy's background in science would prove to be instrumental in helping him complete the Tamil Encyclopedia project, work on which began in 1947. He held that terms pertaining to science and technology were an integral part of the Tamil language.

== Literary career ==
A prolific writer, he composed over 600 songs on national, spiritual and moral issues. He wrote 'a poem a day' for several years after his daily poojas. He became popular and the melody queens N. C. Vasanthakokilam and D. K. Pattammal often included his works in their concerts. A man with noble ideals, Thooran is an acknowledged poet and composer. Analogous to Tyagaraja's 'Santhamulekha, Soukyamuledhu' (set to Sama rāgam), Thooran's 'Santhamillamal sukham undo?' (Nattaikurinji) stresses that there is no joy without patience and no contentment amidst worries. Deep philosophical truths lay hidden in his simple devotional songs. Musical aesthetics and bhava find abundant evidence in his compositions.

While he was not a musician, he had profound poetic talents. Like Arunachala Kavirayar, he had to seek outside help to set his lyrics to music. Sivaramakrishna Iyer (who was born in 1913 in Mavelikara, Kerala and had joined Sri Ramakrishna Vidyalaya as music teacher in 1937) was his guru and choreographer. Thooran also availed of the services of senior musicians like K. V. Narayanaswamy, T. K. Govindarao and T. V. Sankaranarayanan.

Tiger Varadachariar, Musiri Subramania Iyer and Semmangudi Srinivasa Iyer are three of the eminent musicians who have spoken highly of his compositions. His popular compositions include Gananaathane (Saranga), Kaliyuga Varadhan (Brindavana Saranga), Muralidhara Gopala (Maand), Muruga Muruga (Saveri), Pazhani Nindra (Kapi), Punniyam Oru (Keeravani), Thottu Thottu (Padam in BihagVideo on YouTube), and Thaye Thripurasundhari (Shuddha Saveri).

== Contributions to Tamil literature ==
His songs were published in five volumes entitled 'Isai Mani Manjari'. Other publications include 'Thooran Stories' (1962), 'Nalla Nalla Paattu' (1965), 'Call of the Wild' and 'Bharati' for children, some of which were purchased by Tamil Isai Sangam.

He was Chief Editor from 1948 to 1978 of the Tamil Encyclopedia which ran to ten volumes. The credit for bringing out the first-ever Children's Encyclopaedia in Tamil in ten volumes goes to him.

== Personal life ==
Thooran was married to Kaliyammal. Their marriage occurred on 30 April 1939, when Thooran was already 30, which was considered late in those days. The couple went to have four children together - three daughters namely Saradamani, Vasantha and Vijayalakshmi, and a son named Swathanthira Kumar, who was born in the same year as India got Independence, and was named in memory of it.

During his last years, Thooran dealt with numerous diseases related to advanced age. He suffered a massive stroke in 1980 which almost halted his career. Though he survived it, he could not continue his work due to its impact, and died on 20 January 1987, aged 78.

== Works ==
Poetry

- Ilanthamizha
- Minnal Poo
- Nilap Pinju
- Patti Paravaigal
- Thooran Kavithaigal

Short story collections

- Thanga Changili
- Pillai Varam
- Maavilakku
- Kaalingarayan Kodai
- Urimaip Penn
- Thooran Ezhuthoviyangal

Essays

- Thein Chittu
- Poovin Sirippu
- Kaattu Vazhithanile

Plays

- Azhagu Mayakkam
- Ponniyin Thyagam
- Choozhchi
- Ilan Thuravi
- Aadhi Aththi
- Manak Kugai
- Kaadhalum Kadamaiyum

Books on psychology

- Kuzanthai Ullam
- Kuzanthai Manamum Athan Malarchiyum
- Thazhvu Manappanmai
- Adi Manam
- Manamum Adhan Villakamum
- Kumara Paruvam

Book on embryology

- Karuvil Valarum Kuzhandhai

Books on genetics

- Paarambariyam
- Petror Kodutha Perung Kodai

Books for Children - Tamil Nursery Rhymes

- Aanaiyum Poonaiyum
- Nalla Nalla Pattu
- Mazhalai Amudham

Books for Children - Animal stories

- Natya Rani
- Jimmy
- Nila Paatti
- Olai Kili
- Thambiyin Thiramai
- Kadakkitti Mudakkitti
- Manjal Muttai

Books for Children - Other stories

- Maaya Kallan
- Soorap Puli
- Kollimalai Kullan
- Sangagiri Kottaiyin Marmam
- Tharangambody Thangappudhaiyal
- Aanaiyum Poonaiyum

Books for Children - Science

- Parakkum Manidhan

Musical Compositions with Swara notations

- Volume 07 - Published through Annamalai University containing in total 150 songs

- Volume 15 - Published through Annamalai University containing in total 150 songs

- Isai Mani Manjari
- Isai Mani Malai
- Murugan Arul Mani Maalai
- Keerthanai Amudham
- Navamani Isai Malai

Folk Songs

- Katril Vandha Kavithai

Translations from English to Tamil

- Kanagathin Kural (Jack London's Call of the Wild)
- Kadal Kadandha Natppu (Naomi Mitchison's Judy and Lakshmi)
- Paravaigalaip Par (Jamal Ara's Watching Binds)

Editions

- Bharathi Tamizh
- Tagore's Aimperum Katturaigal

Published from palm-leaf manuscripts

- Poet Kalamega's Chithira Madal, with annotations and explanatory notes
- Vadivel Pillai's Mohini Vilasam
- Avinashi Navalan's Thingalur Nonndi Nadakam

Books on Bharathi

- Bharathi Noolagal Oru Thiranaivu
- Bharathiyarin Nagaichuvaiyum, Naiyaandiyum
- Bharathiyum Ulagamum
- Bharathiyum Kadavulum
- Bharathiyum Samoogamum
- Bharathiyum Thamizhagamum
- Bharathiyum Paattum
- Bharathiyum Paapaavum
- Bharathiyum Pennmaiyum
- Bharathiyum Bharatha Desamum

Compilation of Tamil Encyclopedia

- General Encyclopedia, 10 Volumes
- Children's Encyclopedia, 10 Volumes

== Honours and titles ==
- Padma Bhushan by President of India 1968
- Isai Perarignar by Tamil Isai Sangam 1972
- Kalaimamani by Tamil Nadu Iyal Isai Nataka Mandram 1970
- Annamalai Chettiar Award by MAC Charities 1978
