= Alfred Ezra =

Bird collector

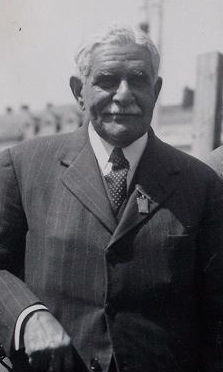
- Alfred Ezra in 1938, photographed by Alexander Wetmore
- Born: 1872; Calcutta
- Died: 1 August, 1955 (aged 82–83); Surrey
- Known for: Rare birds collection
- Spouse: Muriel Sassoon
- Children: 2
- Awards: Gold medal, Zoological Society of London
- Scientific career
- Fields: Aviculture

Alfred "Chips" Ezra, OBE (1872–1955) was a British breeder and keeper of birds. He built up a collection of rare birds at Foxwarren Park in southern England that was considered the finest of its kind.

== Biography ==
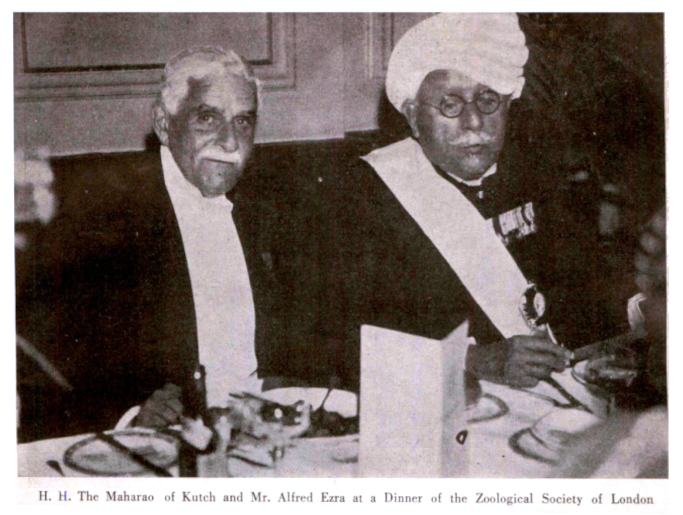
Ezra with Khengarji III at a ZSL dinner, c. 1936

Alfred Ezra was born in India in 1872 to a Jewish family and was privately educated in Calcutta. His father was Elias David Ezra and his mother was Mozelle Sassoon. His brother David Elias Ezra maintained a private zoo in Calcutta.

He moved to England in 1912. During World War I he served with Indian troops in Europe, and was named an Officer of the Order of the British Empire for his efforts.

Ezra acquired Foxwarren Park in Surrey in 1919. There he assembled a private collection of rare birds which was considered the finest of its kind before the World War II, when the estate was commandeered for war work. He was President of the Avicultural Society and a prominent member of the Zoological Society of London, which awarded him a gold medal. He also wrote articles for Avicultural Magazine and other journals.

== Collection ==
Ezra started collecting birds while a child in India. On his journey to England, he travelled through the Pamir Mountains and Turkestan, collecting rare birds and animals on this expedition. From 1920 to 1940, his collection at Foxwarren Park was probably the finest private zoo in the world.

He kept hummingbirds and sunbirds. Their specialised diet of nectar was difficult to reproduce in captivity, and Ezra established the importance of including fat, minerals, protein, and vitamins in their diet. A mixture which he used with success added condensed milk and Mellin's Food—typically food for human babies—to honey, which was then watered down. In this way, he was able to keep a garnet-throated hummingbird for eight years—a remarkable record when these had once been thought impossible to keep in captivity.

Ezra also kept parakeets. In 1933, a pair of fledgling Indian ring-necked parakeets were smothered in their nest by a swarm of bees. He had a pair of pink-headed ducks which were the last of their kind, now being thought extinct. The pink-headed ducks wouldn't breed but the Mandarin ducks which he was sent by Jean Delacour were more successful and founded a large colony across south-east England.

== Personal life and death ==
Ezra married Muriel Sassoon, with whom he had two daughters, Aline and Ruth. He died at Foxwarren Park on 1 August 1955, age 82, after a lengthy illness.
