= Charles M. Inglis =

British naturalist

Charles McFarlane Inglis FZS
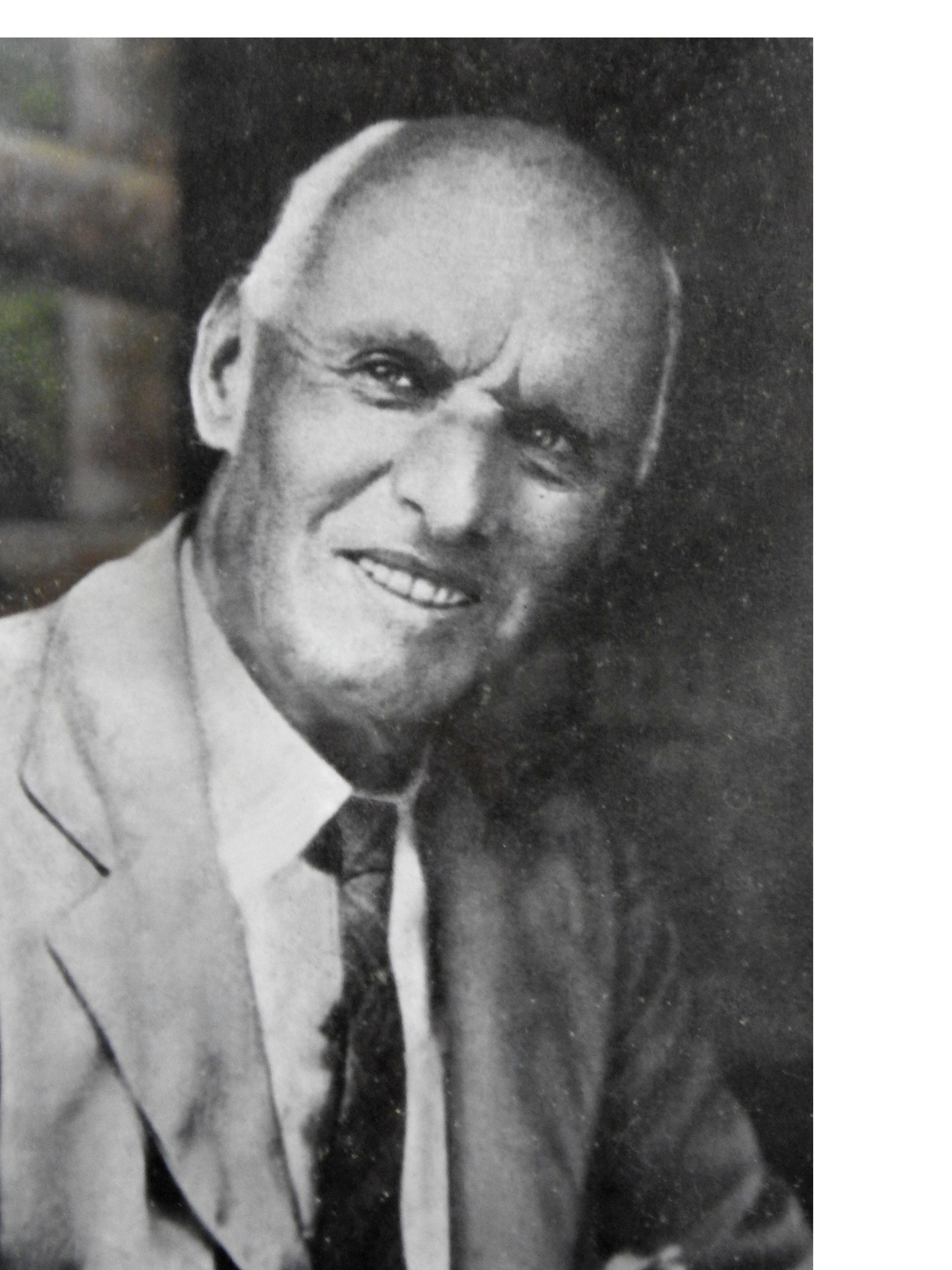
- Born: 8 November 1870; Elgin, Scotland
- Died: 13 February 1954 (aged 83); Coonoor, India
- Occupation: Naturalist
- Known for: Darjeeling Natural History Museum

Charles McFarlane Inglis FES, FZS (8 November 1870 – 13 February 1954) was a naturalist and curator of the Darjeeling museum in India from 1923 to 1948. The museum was run by the Bengal Natural History Society and many of his writings were published in that society's journal which he started and edited.

== Life and work ==
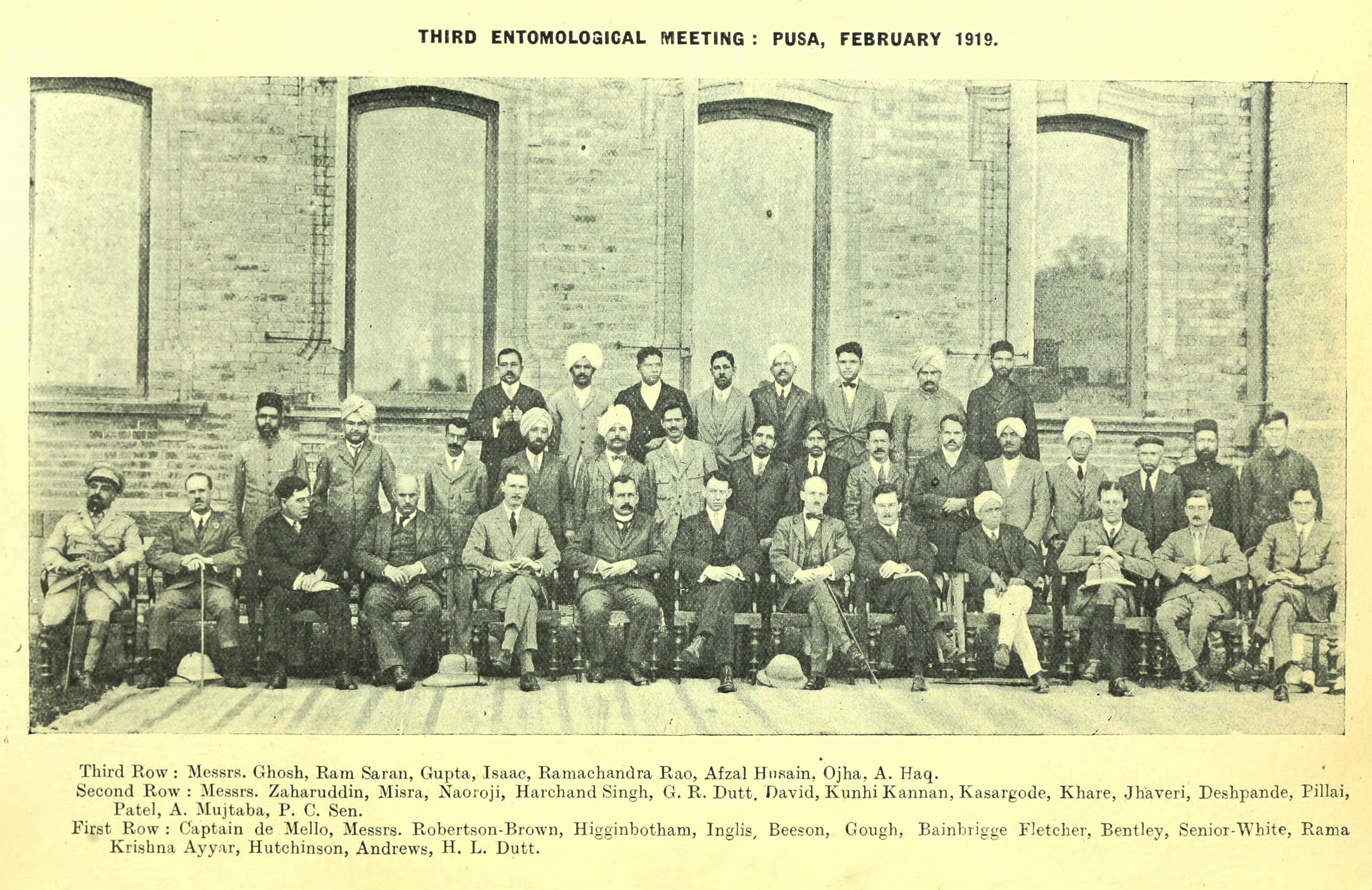
Inglis in 1919 (sitting fourth from left)

Inglis was born in Elgin, Scotland, the third son of Archibald William Inglis, a retired indigo planter in Bihar who had gone to India at the age of 18. A twin sister died in infancy. The family moved to Funchal, Madeira for his father's health and after his death there, the mother and children moved to Geneva. Charles and his brother Harold became interested in natural history. The family then moved to Clifton, Gloucestershire, where the boys continued to collect butterflies including some rare specimens from natural history specimen trader Mann. Their mother moved back to Geneva and the boys went to Stanley House, Stirlingshire, spending summers in Switzerland. They knew excellent French. At seventeen he worked in the Highand railway in Inverness while two older brothers moved to indigo farming in Bihar. He got a job at Roopachera estate in Hailekandi thanks to a godfather in Calcutta in 1889. He became interested in birds after a muslim collector working for Allan Octavian Hume showed him a specimen of an oriole and hired Inglis to collect for him at Rs 35 a month. He subsequently contacted E C Stuart Baker. In 1894 he moved the Larsingah tea estate in Happy Valley. Three years later he contracted malaria and spent about half a year in the Nilgiris to recover. He returned to Calcutta and once again got malaria. In 1898 he joined his brothers and became an indigo planter in Baghownie. During this time made studies of birds and collected many specimens of butterflies and dragonflies. He bred Burmese peafowl and swamp partridge in outdoor aviaries. In 1923 he took over as curator of the Darjeeling Natural History Museum. In September 1945 he married Sybil Dorothy Hunt. In 1948, he retired to Coonoor where he died in 1954. He encouraged the bird studies by Mrs Jamal Ara, providing her with all his notes from Darbhanga.

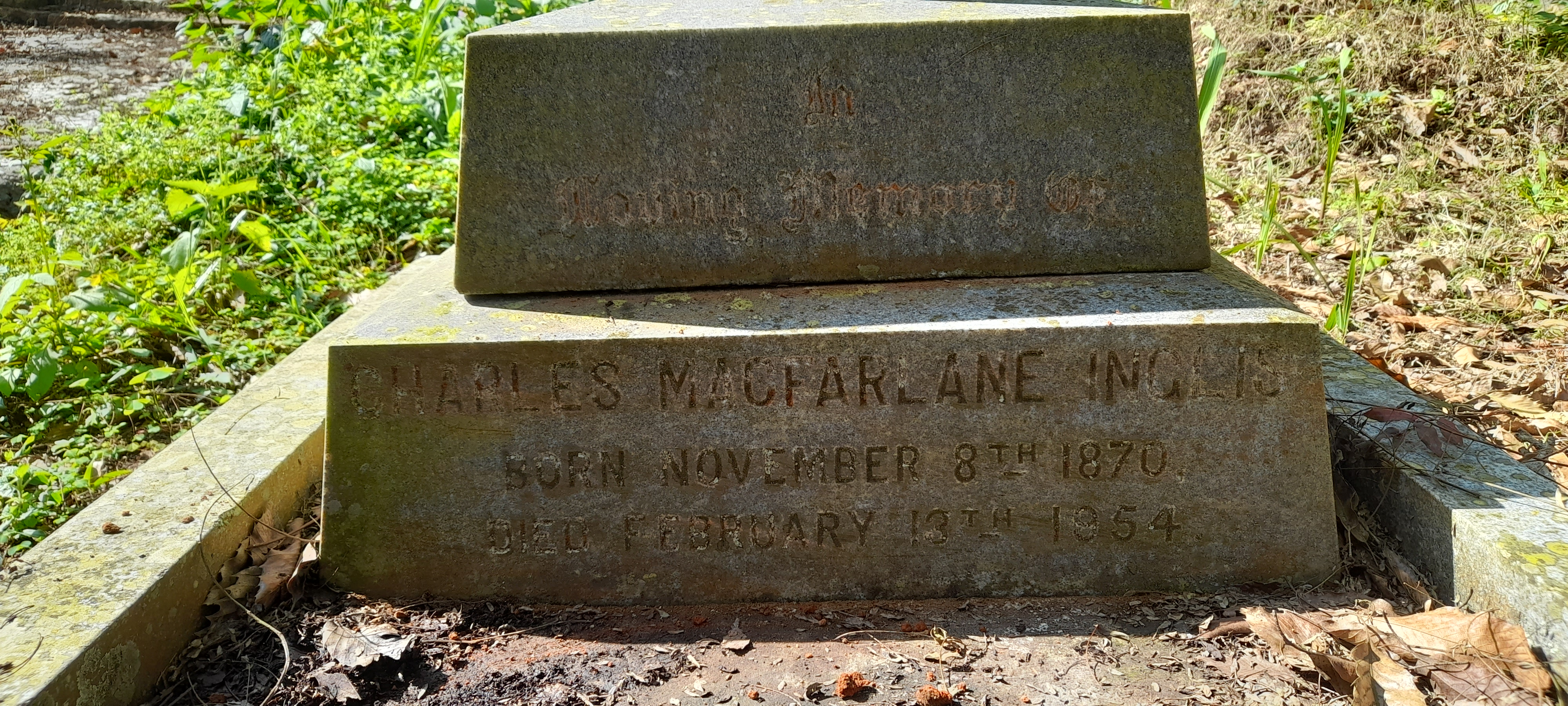
Grave at Tiger Hill cemetery, Coonoor

His ability to sketch and illustrate birds led to Thomas Bainbrigge Fletcher inviting him to produce a series of articles on birds of importance to agriculture in India. These were published in the Agricultural Journal of India and were later revised and published as a book Birds of an Indian Garden in 1924.

Inglis shot eight specimens of the pink-headed duck in Bihar from 1903, including the last known specimen collected in June 1935 from Baghownie. Several species of dragonflies were named from specimens he collected, these include Megalestes irma, Bayadera longicauda, Davidius zallorensis delineatus, Anormogomphus heteropterus. The fish Nemacheilus rupicola var. inglisi was named after him as also the birds Prinia socialis inglisi, and Cryptoplectron manipurensis inglisi.

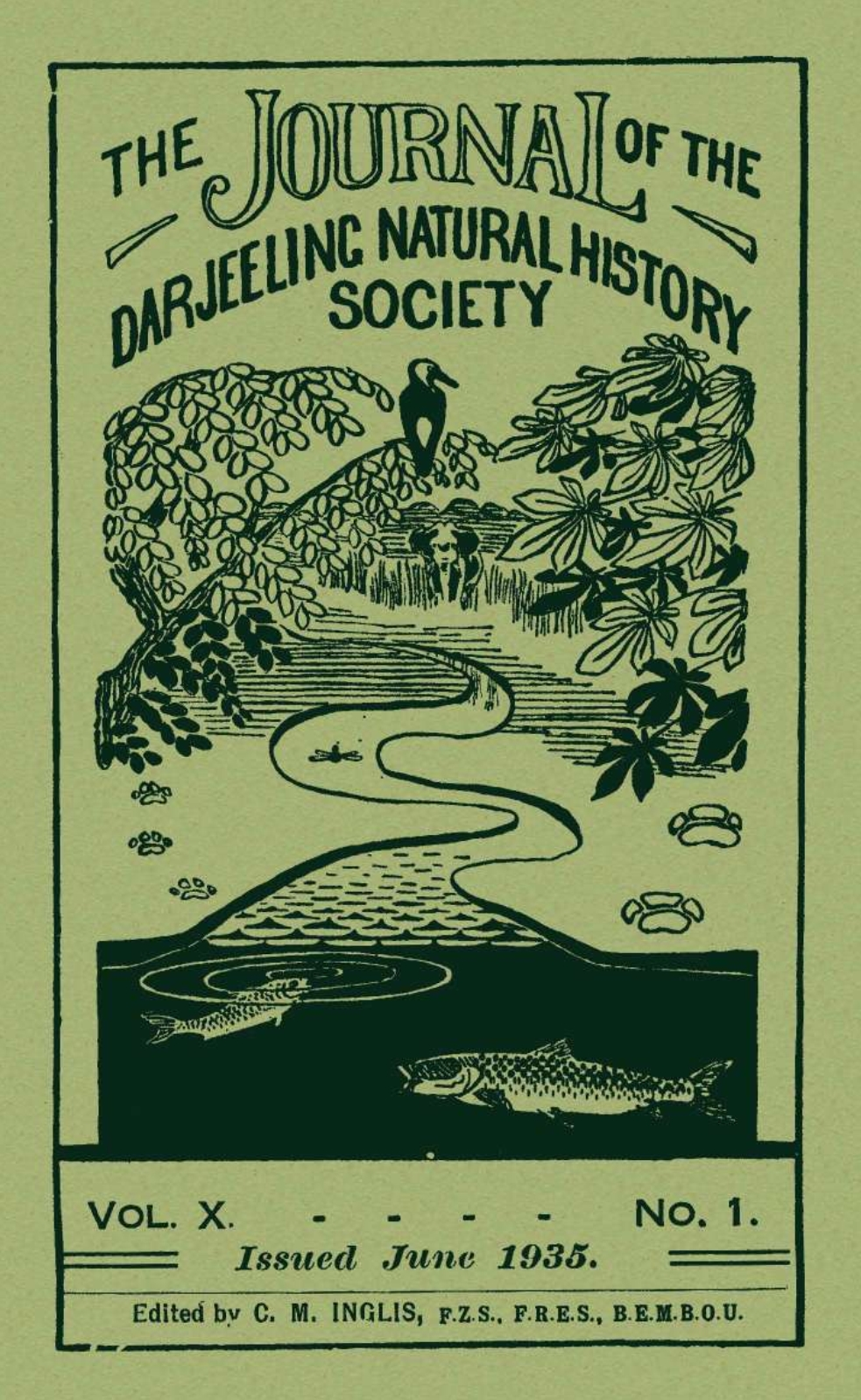
Cover of the Journal of the Darjeeling Natural History Society

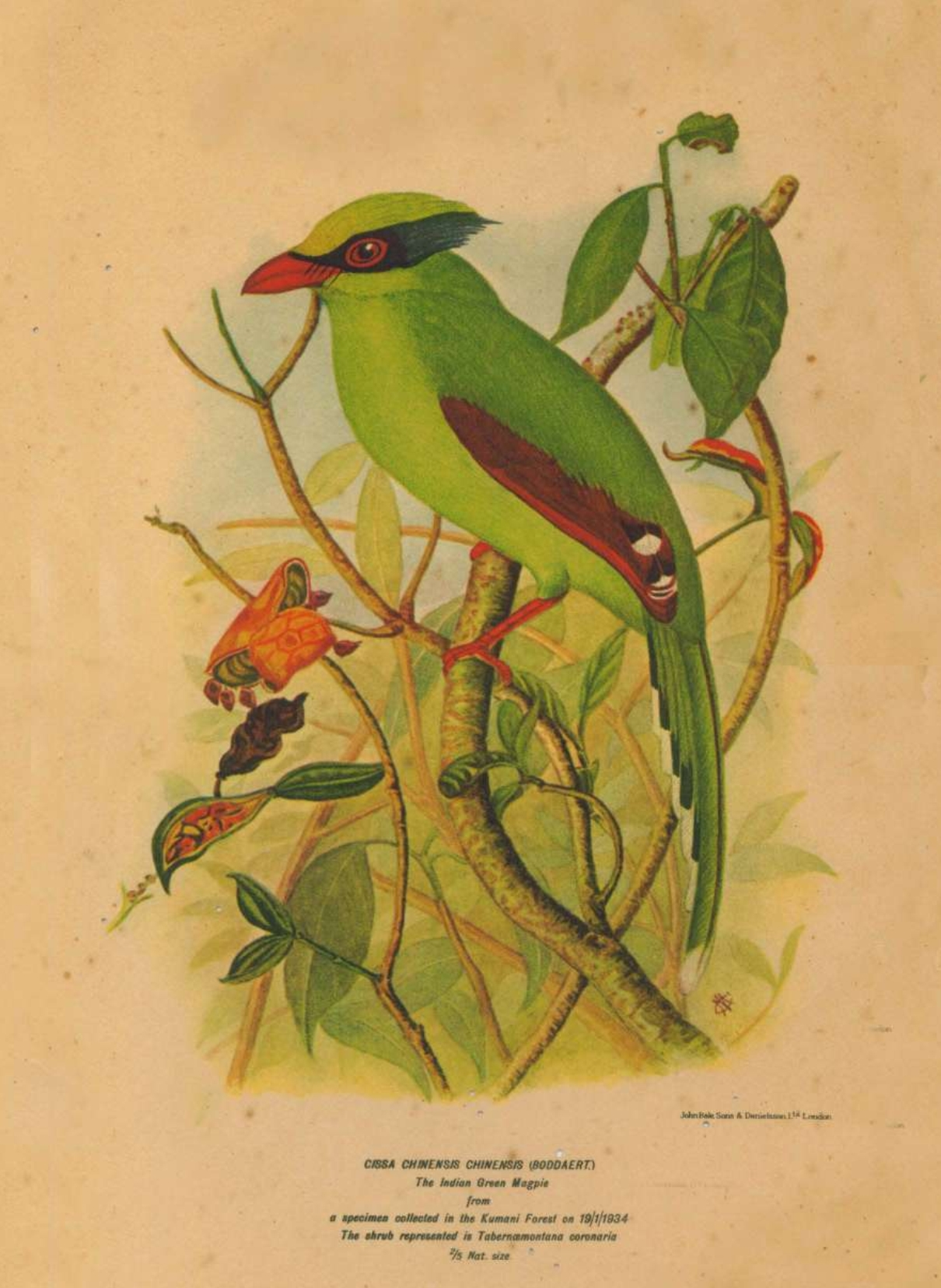
Cissa chinensis

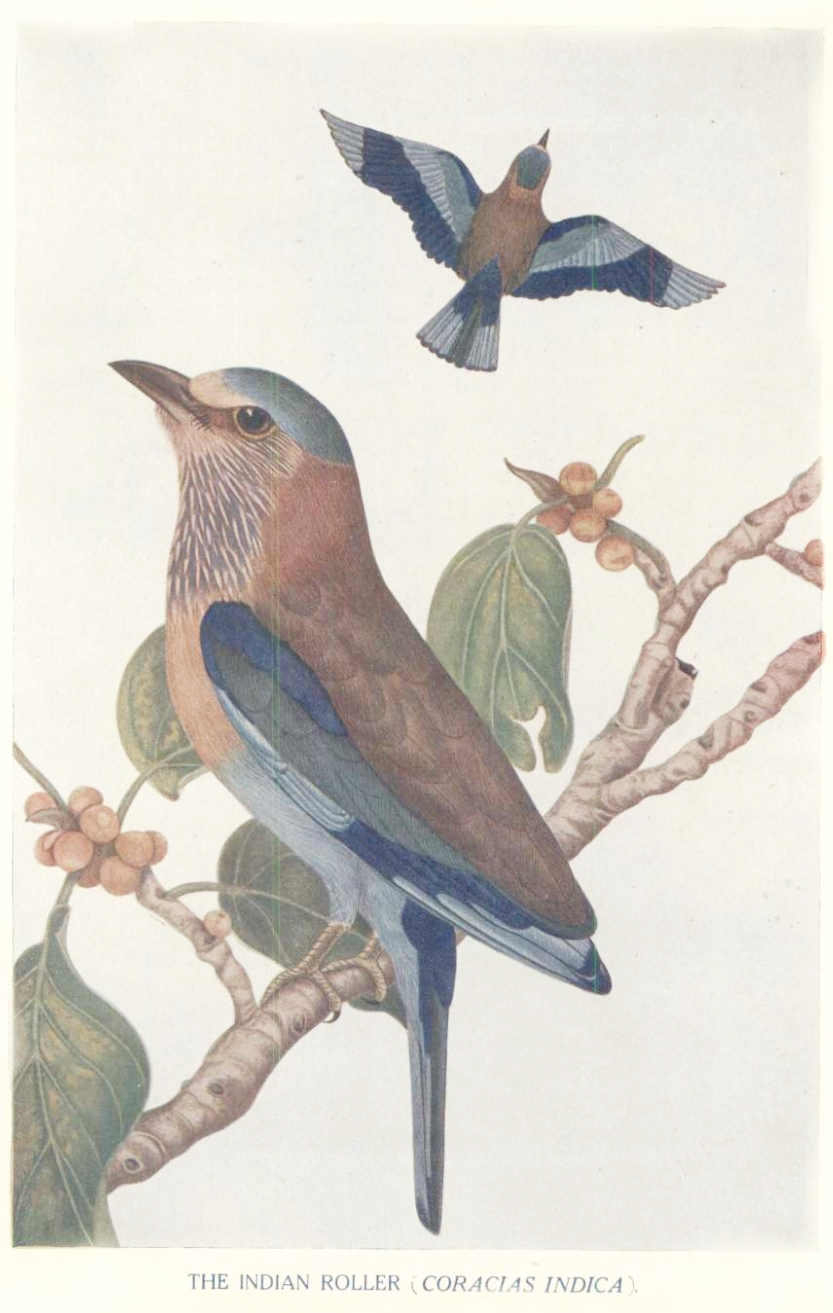
Indian roller

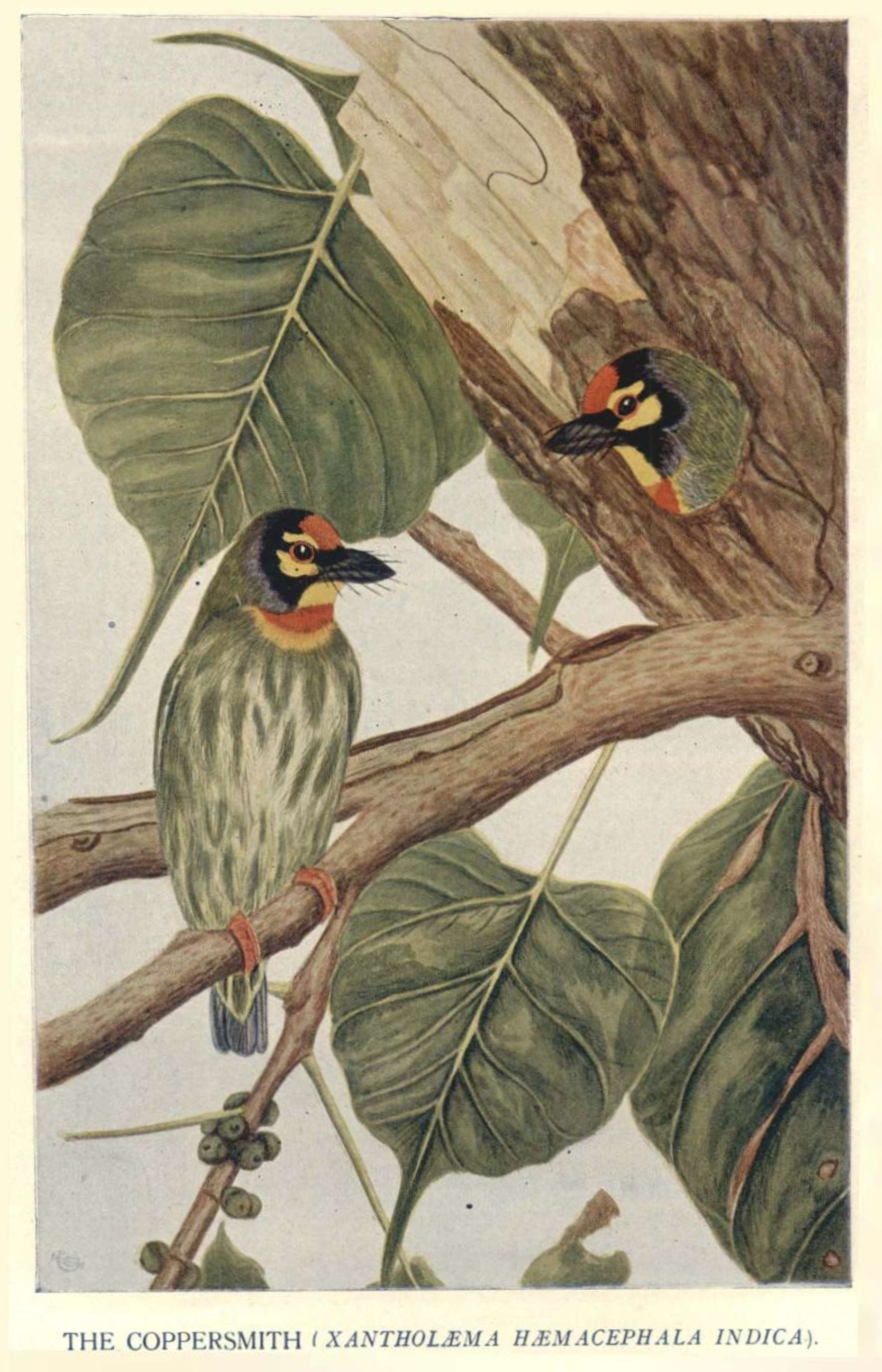
Coppersmith barbet

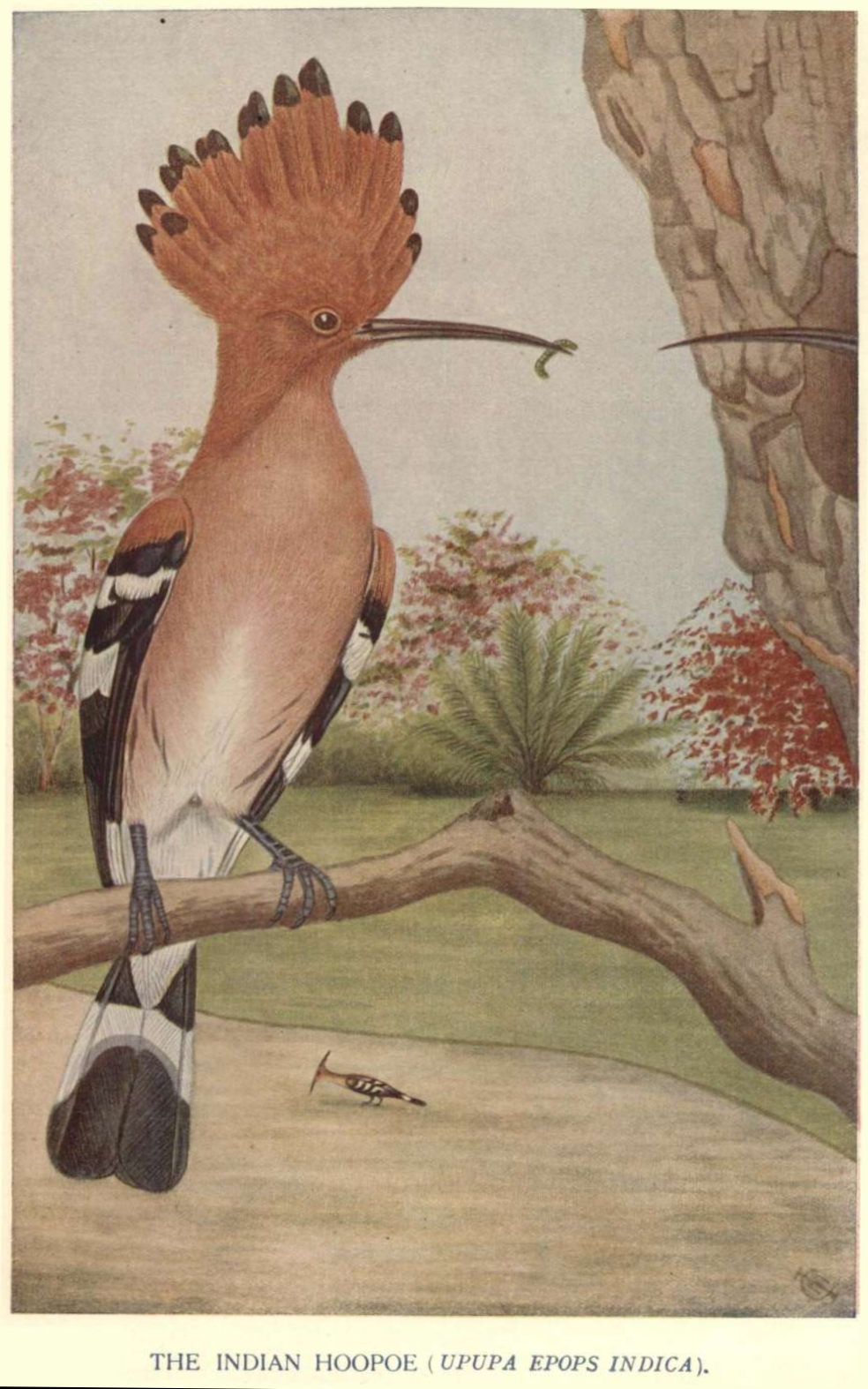
Hoopoe

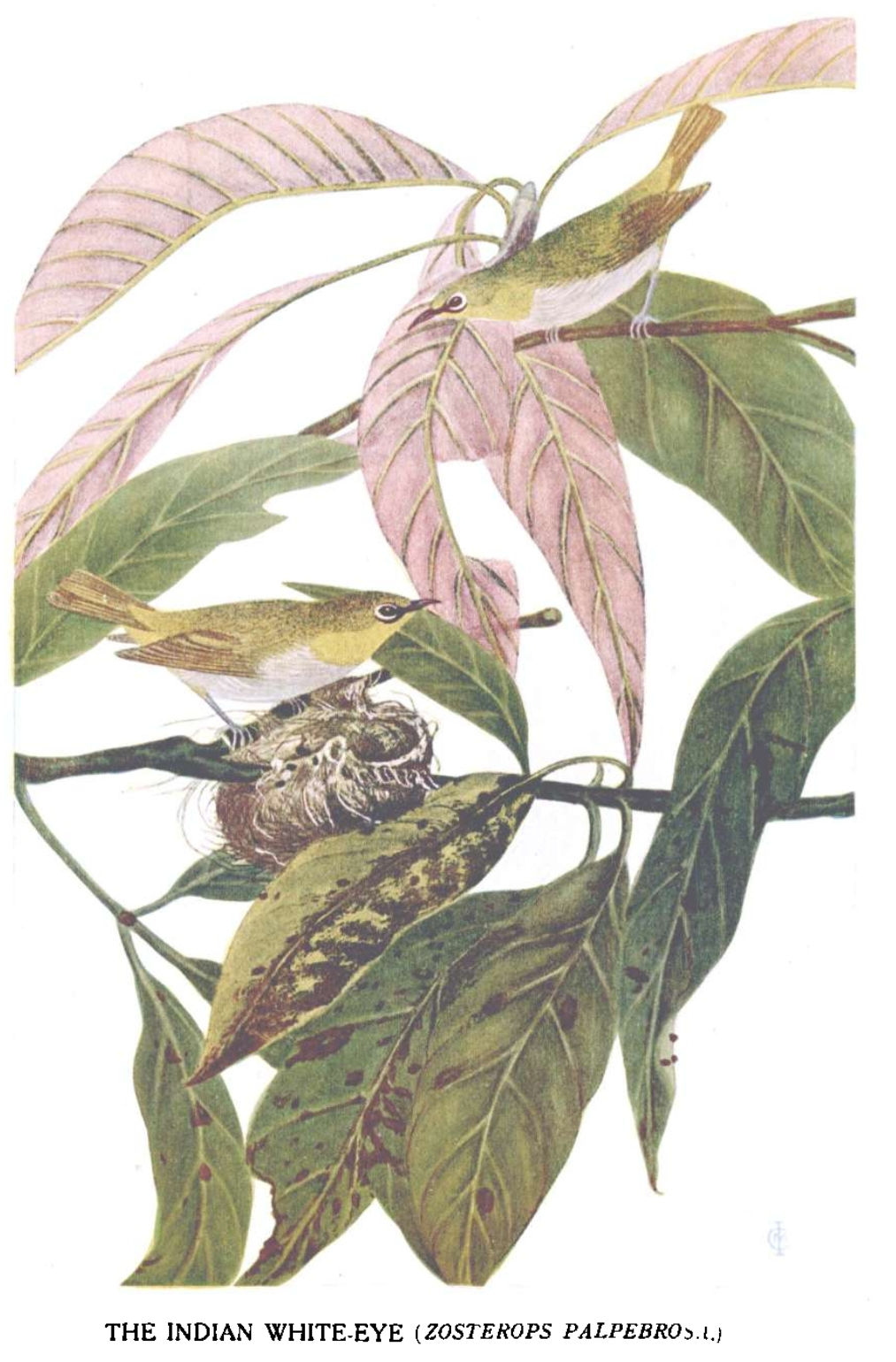
Oriental white-eye

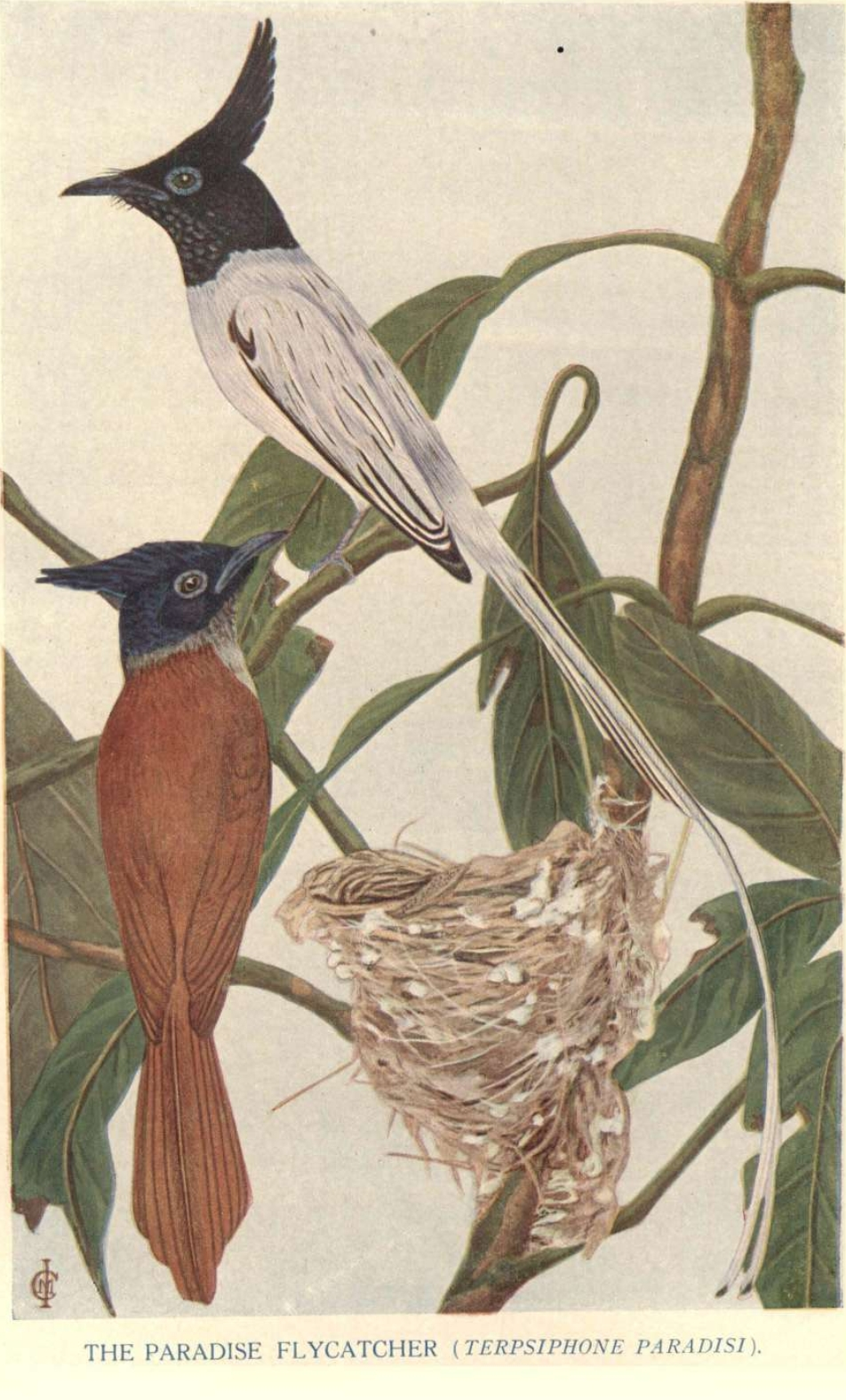
Indian paradise flycatcher

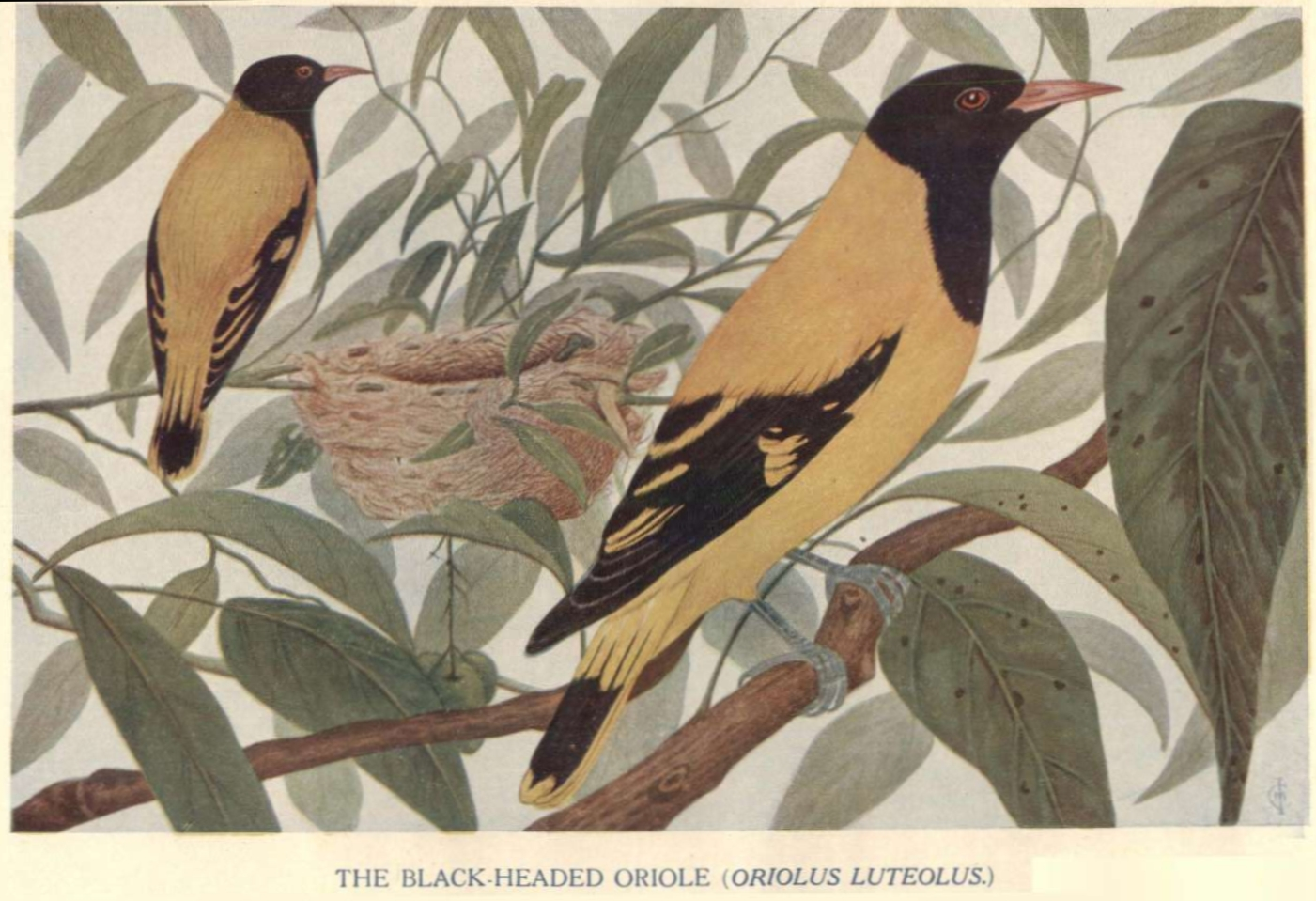
Indian golden oriole

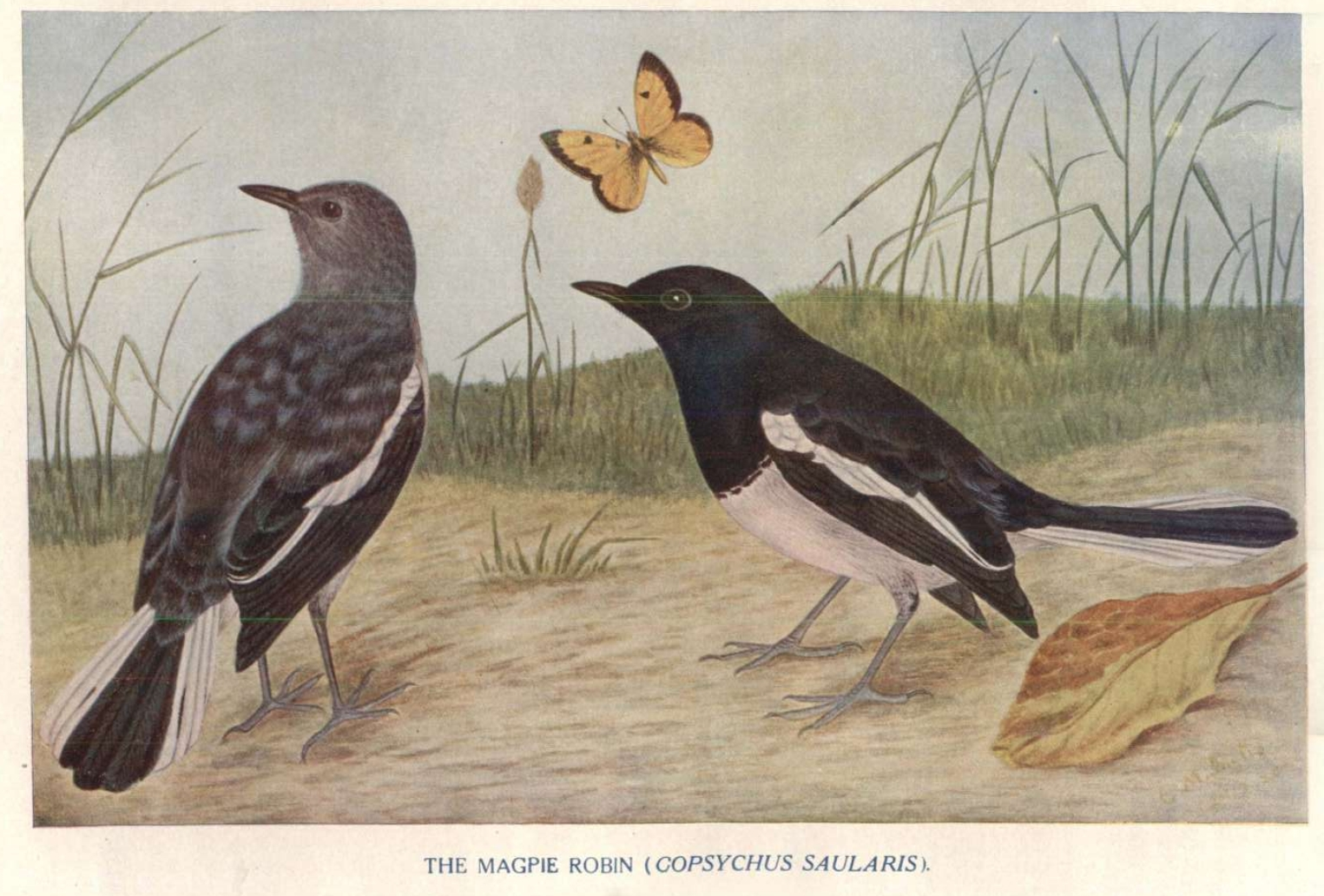
Oriental magpie robin

== Publications ==
- Baker, H. R. & C. M. Inglis. The Birds of Southern India including Madras, Malabar, Travancore, Cochin, Coorg and Mysore. Government Press, Madras (1930)
- Fletcher, T. B. and C. M. Inglis Birds of an Indian Garden. Calcutta & Simla: Thacker, Spink & Co. (1924)
- Inglis C. M. The leaf insect – Phyllium scythe Gr. J. Darjeeling Nat Hist. Soc. 5 : 32–33 (1930)
